= Roero =

Coordinates: 44.7000°N 7.8500°E

- Traditional region
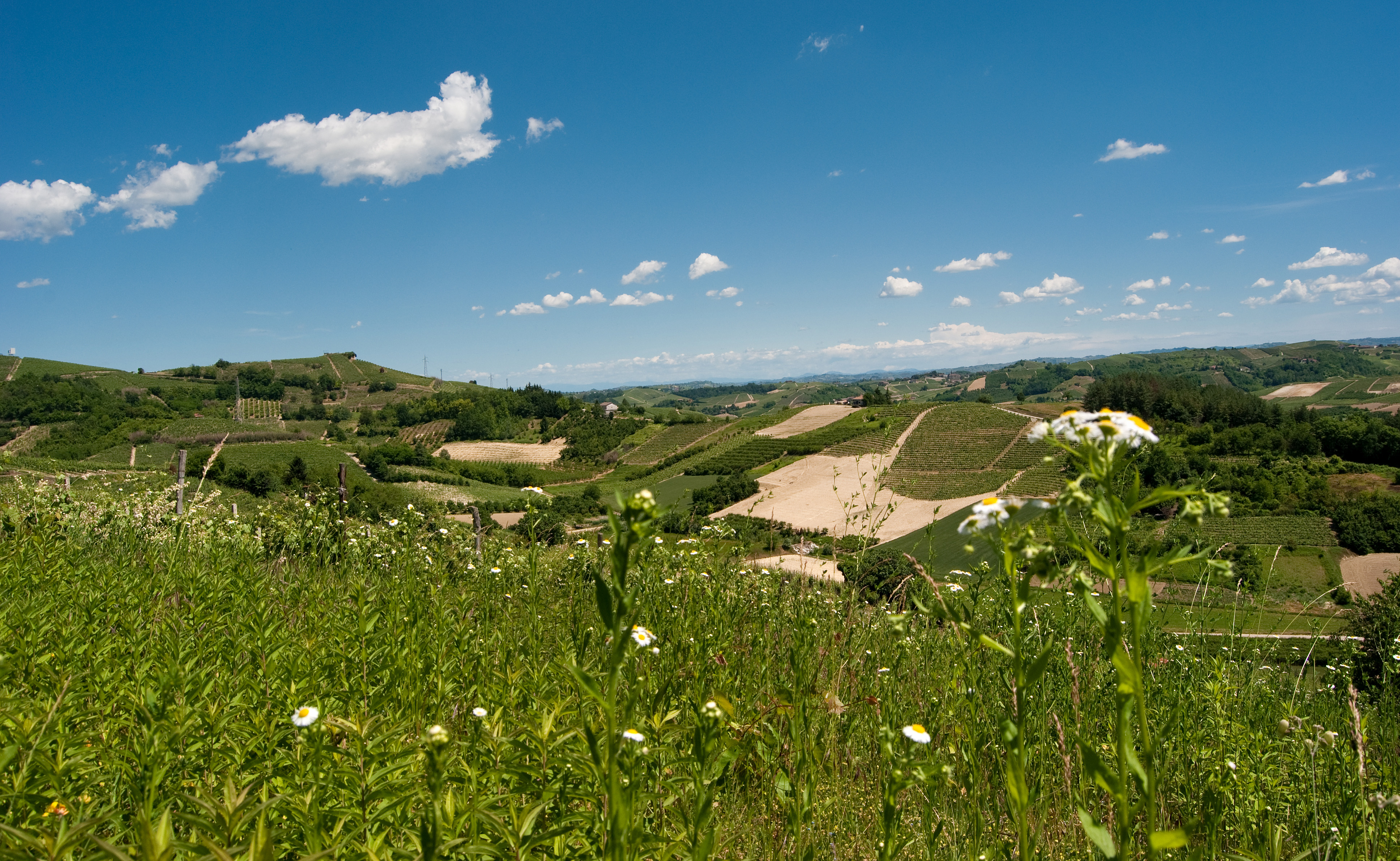
- Summer on the hills of Roero

- Coat of arms

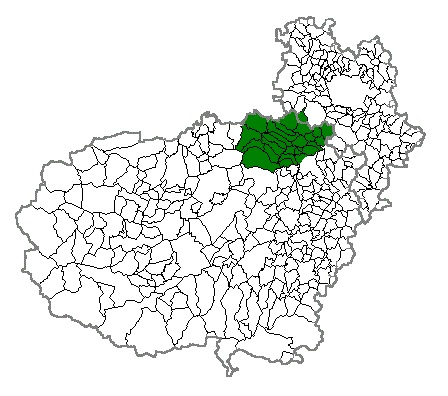
- Country: Italy

Roero (Italian pronunciation: [roˈɛːro]; Piedmontese: Roé [rʊˈe]) is a geographical area in the north-east corner of the province of Cuneo in Piedmont, north-west Italy. This hilly region is known for its wines and for its fruit production: particularly the peaches of Canale and the local variety of pear known as Madernassa which originated in the late eighteenth century in Vezza d'Alba. Strawberries are also grown.

The name comes from the Roero family of bankers and traders, who were prominent in the political life of Asti and its environs, and who dominated this area for a number of centuries during the Middle Ages.

The designated zone of production for the DOCG wines Roero and Roero Arneis is a subset of this territory which comprises the communes of Castellinaldo, Canale, Corneliano d’Alba, Piobesi d’Alba and Vezza d’Alba, plus parts of Baldissero d'Alba, Castagnito, Guarene, Govone, Magliano Alfieri, Montà, Monteu Roero, Pocapaglia, Priocca, Santa Vittoria d'Alba, Santo Stefano Roero and Sommariva Perno.

== Extent ==
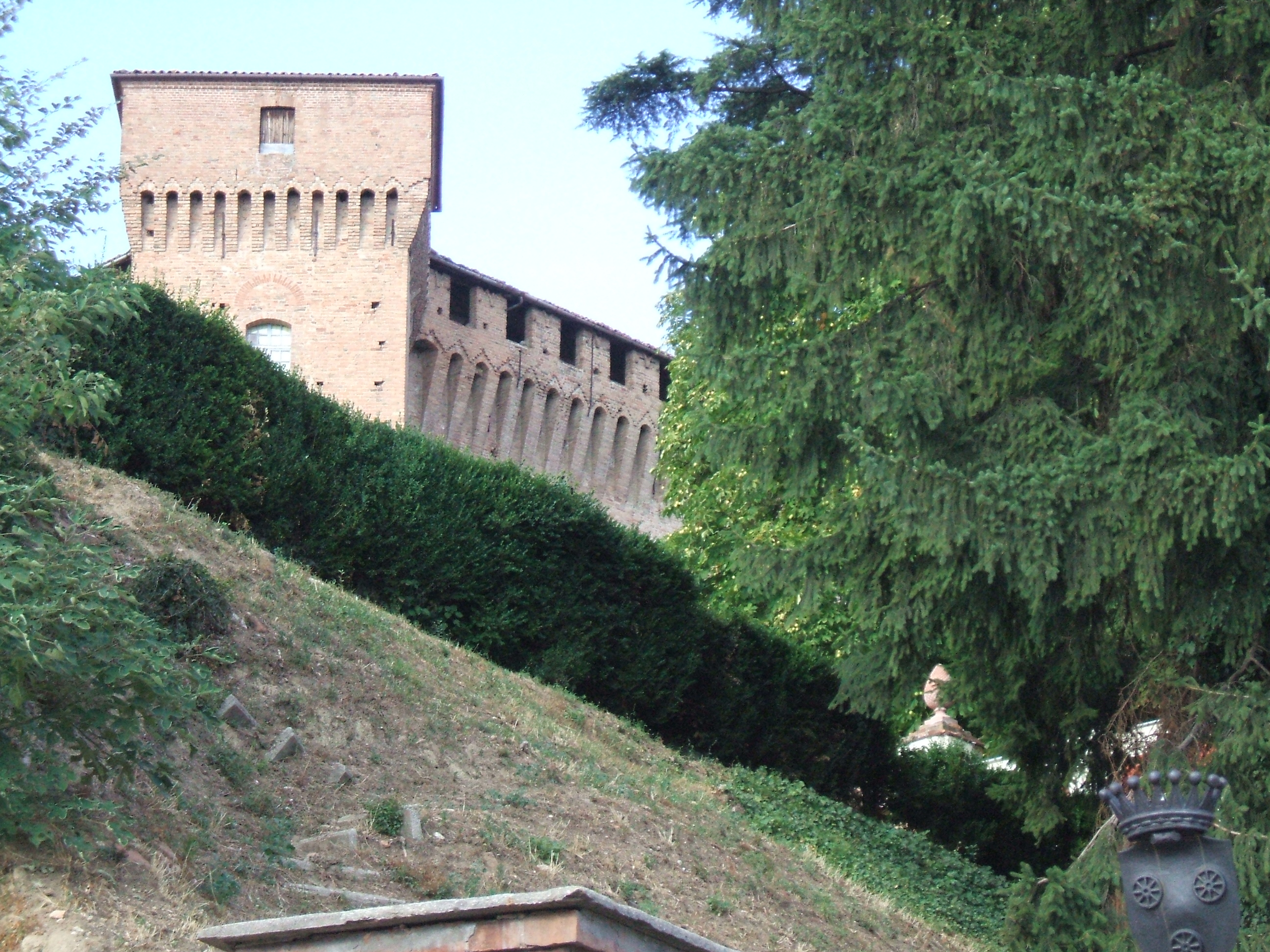
The castle of the Roero family at Monticello d'Alba.

The territory lies to the north of Alba. The river Tanaro marks its southern border, dividing it from the Langhe. To the north-east its informal boundary with Monferrato follows approximately the line of the border between the provinces of Cuneo and Asti, although Cisterna d’Asti can be taken to be part of Roero. To the north-west it is confined by the province of Turin. To the west its border is taken to be the SS 661 state road which runs through the communes of Bra, Sanfrè and Sommariva del Bosco.

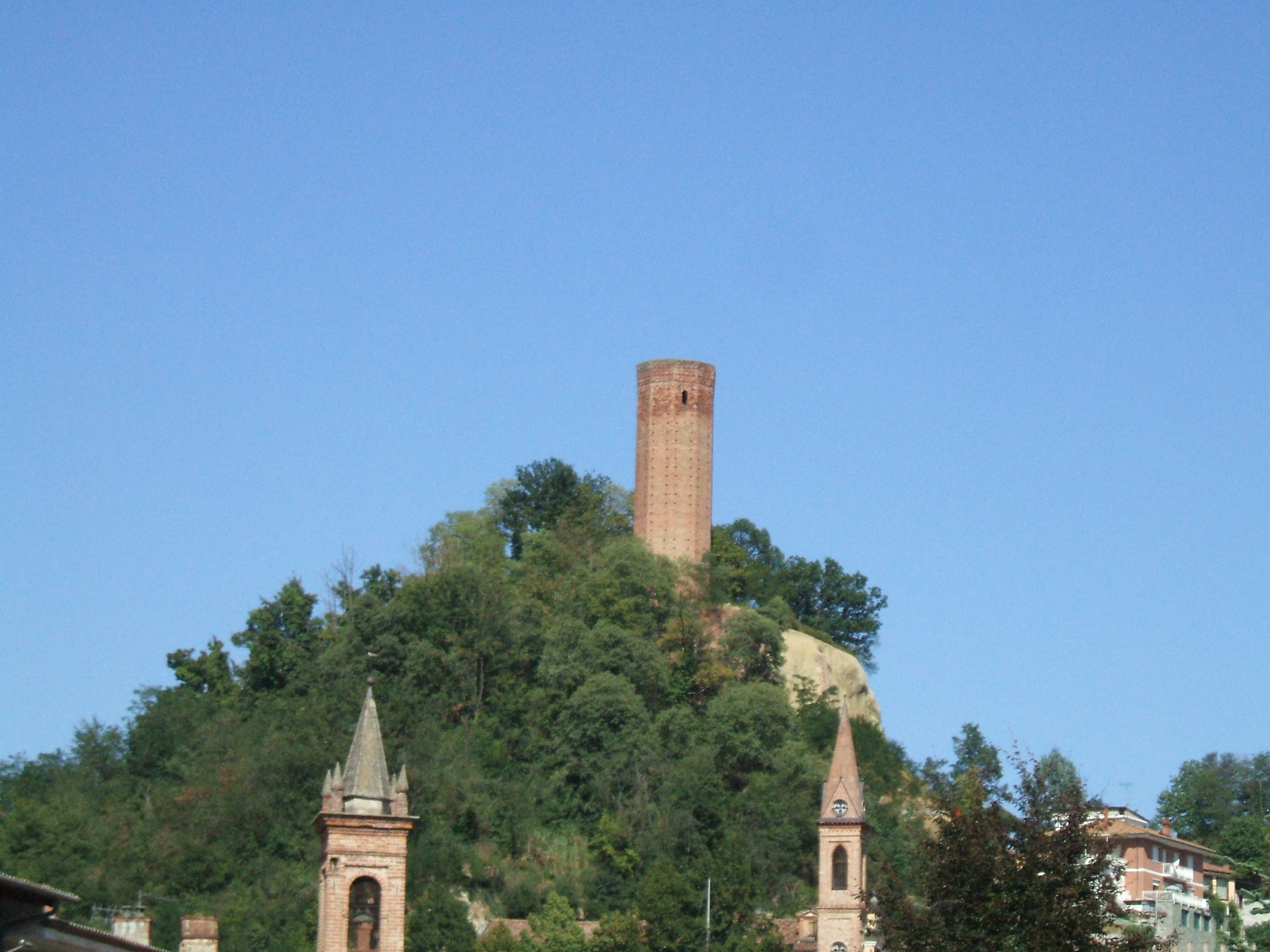
Corneliano d'Alba

The communes which fall, partly or entirely within Roero are thus:

- Alba
- Baldissero d’Alba
- Bra
- Canale
- Castagnito
- Castellinaldo
- Ceresole Alba
- Cisterna d’Asti
- Corneliano d’Alba
- Govone
- Guarene
- Magliano Alfieri
- Montà
- Montaldo Roero
- Monteu Roero
- Monticello d’Alba
- Piobesi d’Alba
- Pocapaglia
- Priocca
- Sanfrè
- Santa Vittoria d’Alba
- Santo Stefano Roero
- Sommariva del Bosco
- Sommariva Perno
- Vezza d’Alba

== Viticulture ==
Vineyard Landscape of Piedmont: Langhe-Roero
UNESCO World Heritage Site
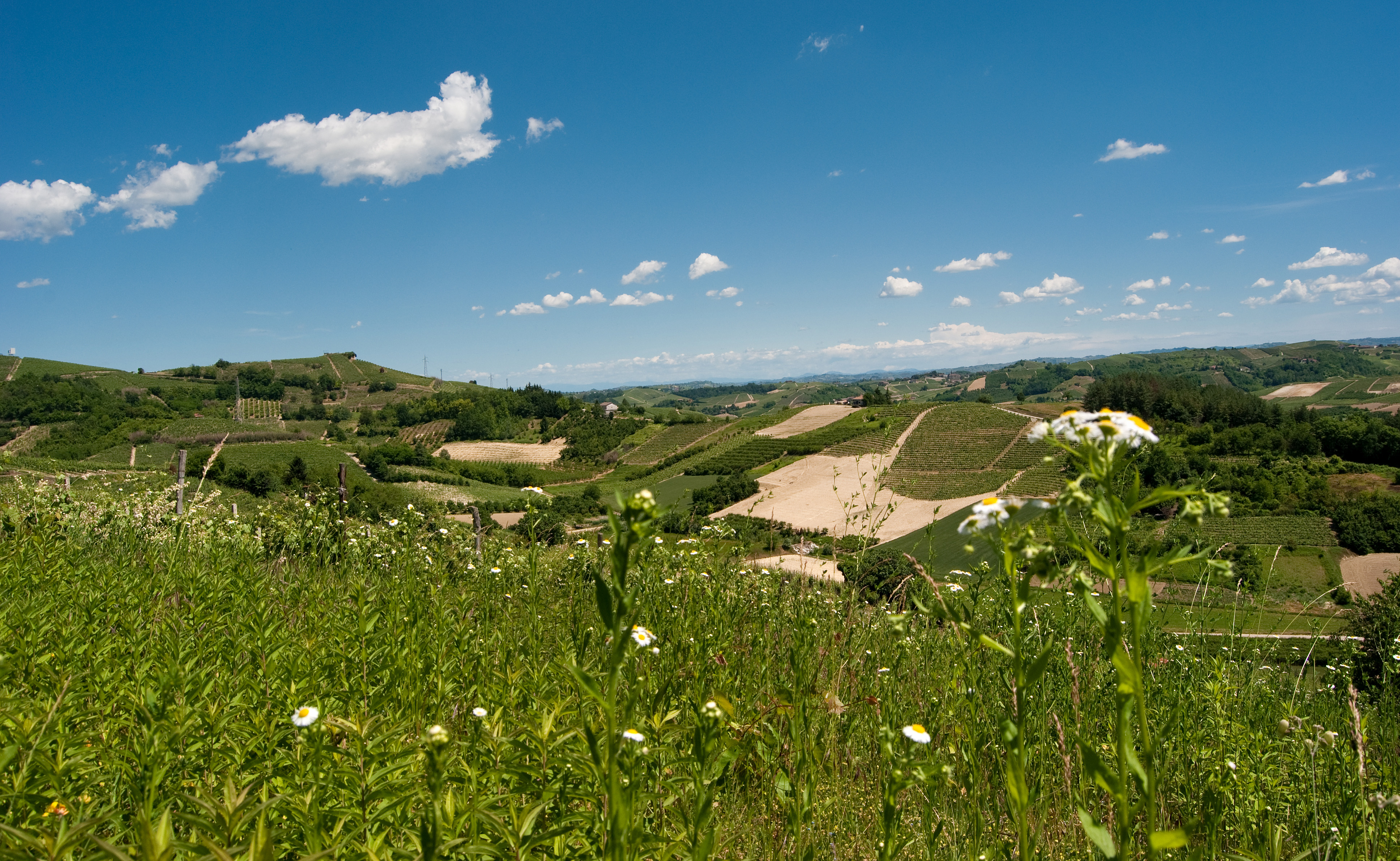
- Interactive map of Vineyard Landscape of Piedmont: Langhe-Roero
- Location: Province of Cuneo, Piedmont, Italy
- Part of: Vineyard Landscape of Piedmont: Langhe-Roero and Monferrato
- Criteria: Cultural: (iii)(v)
- Reference: 1390rev
- Inscription: 2014 (38th Session)

Roero is a recognized wine-making area of the Province of Cuneo in the Piedmont region; along with its neighbours Langhe and Monferrato it forms the “Distretto Langhe, Roero e Monferrato” wine district.

Roero wines include the red Roero, as well as the white Roero Arneis, and sparkling white Roero Arneis Spumante. The name "Roero" lacking any further specification is reserved for red wines made from a minimum of 95% Nebbiolo grapes with the addition of 2%–5% of non-aromatic red varieties. Roero must be aged in cellars for twenty months, six of them in wooden barrels, while Roero riserva (reserve) must be aged at least 32 months total, with the same minimum of six months spent in wood. Nebbiolo has 194.90 hectares dedicated to it in Roero.

Meanwhile, Roero Arneis and Roero Arneis Spumante are made from 95% Arneis grapes with the rest from non-aromatic white varieties of the Piedmonte region. The Arneis grape variety has 832.89 hectares of vineyards devoted to it in Roero.

Roero became a DOC region in 1985 and a DOCG region in 2005.

Other wines produced include Barbera d'Alba, Birbèt, Bonarda, Favorita, Moscato d'Asti and Nebbiolo d'Alba.
