= Corneliano d'Alba =

- Comune
- Comune di Corneliano d'Alba
- Coat of arms

- Location within Italy Location within Piedmont
- Coordinates: 44°44′N 7°57′E
- Country: Italy
- Region: Piedmont
- Province: Province of Cuneo (CN)

Area
  - Total: 10.3 km^{2} (4.0 sq mi)

Population (Dec. 2004)
  - Total: 1,979
  - Density: 192/km^{2} (498/sq mi)
- Time zone: UTC+1 (CET)
  - Summer (DST): UTC+2 (CEST)
- Postal code: 12040
- Dialing code: 0173

Corneliano d'Alba is a comune (municipality) in the Province of Cuneo in the Italian region Piedmont, located about 40 kilometres (25 mi) southeast of Turin and about 50 kilometres (31 mi) northeast of Cuneo. As of 31 December 2004, it had a population of 1,979 and an area of 10.3 square kilometres (4.0 mi^{2}).

Corneliano d'Alba borders the following municipalities: Alba, Baldissero d'Alba, Guarene, Montaldo Roero, Monticello d'Alba, Piobesi d'Alba, Sommariva Perno, and Vezza d'Alba.

== Demographic evolution ==
Historical population

Year	Pop.	±%
1861	1,988	—
1871	2,167	+9.0%
1881	2,306	+6.4%
1901	2,412	+4.6%
1911	2,308	−4.3%

Year	Pop.	±%
1921	2,312	+0.2%
1931	2,452	+6.1%
1936	2,391	−2.5%
1951	1,995	−16.6%
1961	1,766	−11.5%

Year	Pop.	±%
1971	1,851	+4.8%
1981	1,773	−4.2%
1991	1,845	+4.1%
2001	1,889	+2.4%

Source: Data from ISTAT
