= Castellinaldo d'Alba =

- Comune
- Comune di Castellinaldo d'Alba
- Coat of arms

- Location within Italy Location within Piedmont
- Coordinates: 44°47′N 8°2′E
- Country: Italy
- Region: Piedmont
- Province: Province of Cuneo (CN)

Area
  - Total: 7.9 km^{2} (3.1 sq mi)

Population (Dec. 2004)
  - Total: 881
  - Density: 110/km^{2} (290/sq mi)
- Demonym: Castellinaldesi
- Time zone: UTC+1 (CET)
  - Summer (DST): UTC+2 (CEST)
- Postal code: 12050
- Dialing code: 0173

Castellinaldo d'Alba is a comune (municipality) in the Province of Cuneo in the Italian region Piedmont, located about 40 kilometres (25 mi) southeast of Turin and about 60 kilometres (37 mi) northeast of Cuneo. As of 31 December 2004, it had a population of 881 and an area of 7.9 square kilometres (3.1 mi^{2}).

Castellinaldo borders the following municipalities: Canale, Castagnito, Magliano Alfieri, Priocca, and Vezza d'Alba.

== Demographic evolution ==
Historical population

Year	Pop.	±%
1861	1,433	—
1871	1,480	+3.3%
1881	1,553	+4.9%
1901	1,698	+9.3%
1911	1,714	+0.9%

Year	Pop.	±%
1921	1,661	−3.1%
1931	1,646	−0.9%
1936	1,475	−10.4%
1951	1,277	−13.4%
1961	1,041	−18.5%

Year	Pop.	±%
1971	893	−14.2%
1981	814	−8.8%
1991	783	−3.8%
2001	858	+9.6%

Source: Data from ISTAT
