= Sommariva Perno =

- Comune
- Comune di Sommariva Perno
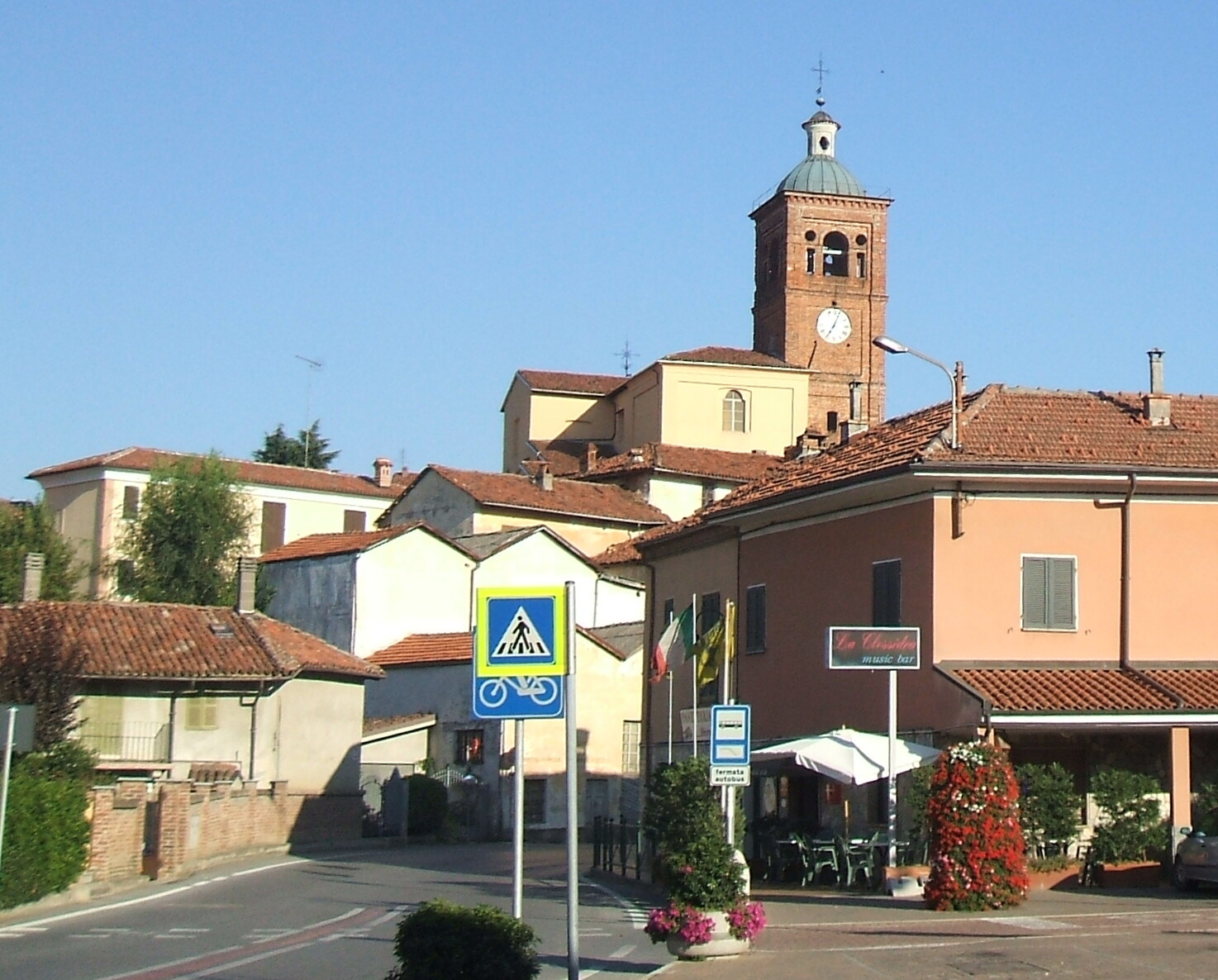

- Location within Italy Location within Piedmont
- Coordinates: 44°45′N 7°54′E
- Country: Italy
- Region: Piedmont
- Province: Province of Cuneo (CN)
- Frazioni: Valle Rossi, San Giuseppe, Villa

Area
  - Total: 17.4 km^{2} (6.7 sq mi)
- Elevation: 389 m (1,276 ft)

Population (Dec. 2004)
  - Total: 2,800
  - Density: 160/km^{2} (420/sq mi)
- Demonym: Sommarivesi
- Time zone: UTC+1 (CET)
  - Summer (DST): UTC+2 (CEST)
- Postal code: 12040
- Dialing code: 0172
- Website: Official website

Sommariva Perno is a comune (municipality) in the Province of Cuneo in the Italian region Piedmont, located in Roero about 40 kilometres (25 mi) southeast of Turin and about 50 kilometres (31 mi) northeast of Cuneo. As of 31 December 2004, it had a population of 2,800 and an area of 17.4 square kilometres (6.7 mi^{2}).

The municipality of Sommariva Perno contains the frazioni (subdivisions, mainly villages and hamlets) Valle Rossi, San Giuseppe, and Villa.

Sommariva Perno borders the following municipalities: Baldissero d'Alba, Corneliano d'Alba, Monticello d'Alba, Pocapaglia, Sanfrè, and Sommariva del Bosco.

== Festivals ==
The “Sagra della fragola e del vino birbet”, held at the end of May, celebrates two of the typical products of Roero: The local strawberries and Birbèt: a sweet, pomegranate-red, partially fermented, festive wine made from the Roero version of the Brachetto grape (Italian: brachetto dal grappolo lungo), which hangs from the vine in elongated clusters.

== Demographic evolution ==
Historical population

Year	Pop.	±%
1861	2,177	—
1871	2,167	−0.5%
1881	2,202	+1.6%
1901	2,495	+13.3%
1911	2,569	+3.0%

Year	Pop.	±%
1921	2,734	+6.4%
1931	2,884	+5.5%
1936	2,749	−4.7%
1951	2,416	−12.1%
1961	2,205	−8.7%

Year	Pop.	±%
1971	2,232	+1.2%
1981	2,249	+0.8%
1991	2,279	+1.3%
2001	2,626	+15.2%

Source: Data from ISTAT
