= Monteu Roero =

- Comune
- Comune di Monteu Roero
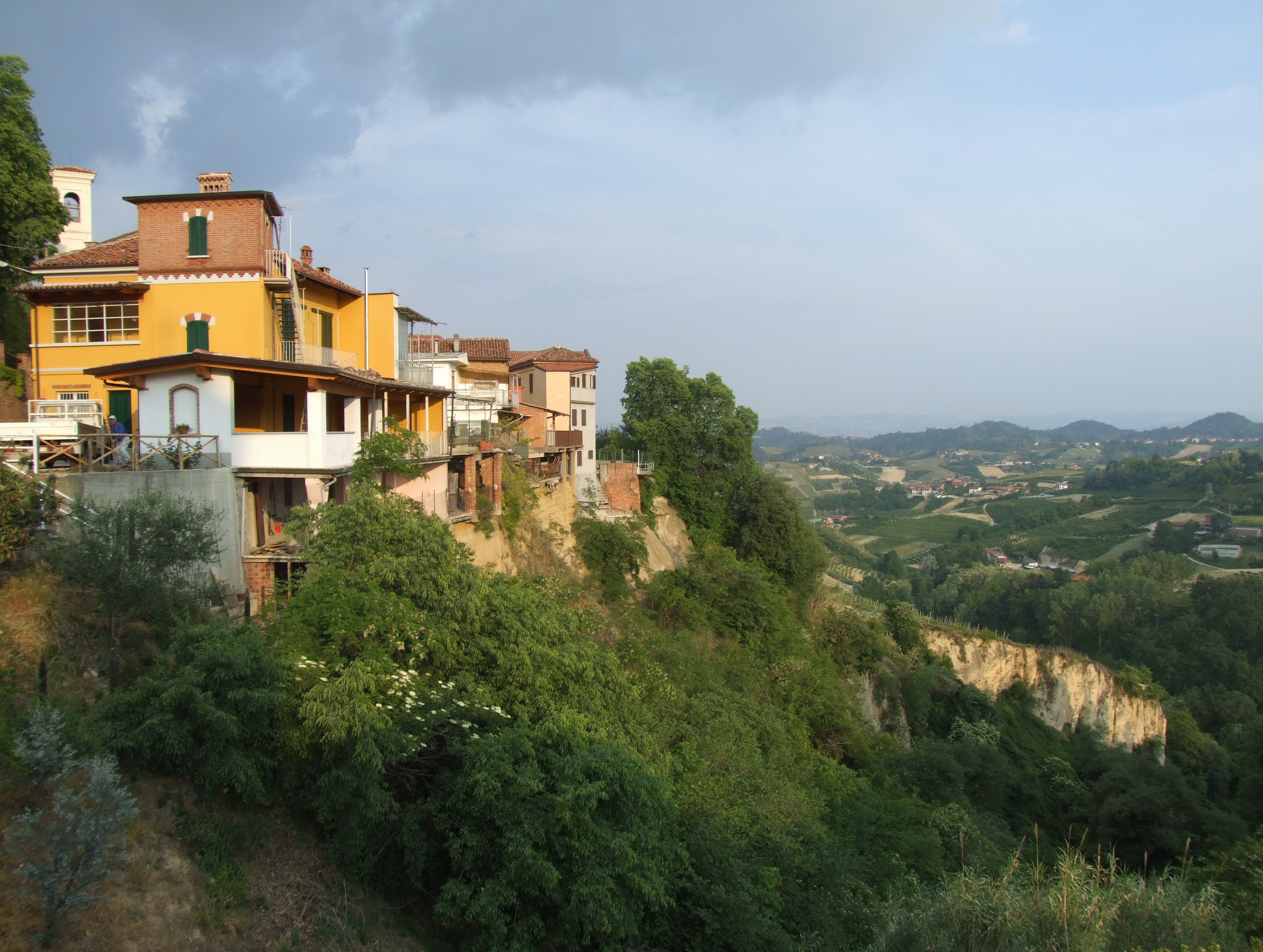

- Coat of arms

- Location within Italy Location within Piedmont
- Coordinates: 44°46′49.08″N 7°56′15.0″E
- Country: Italy
- Region: Piedmont
- Province: Cuneo (CN)

Government
  - Mayor: Michele Sandri

Area
  - Total: 24.45 km^{2} (9.44 sq mi)
- Elevation: 395 m (1,296 ft)

Population (31 December 2010)
  - Total: 1,672
  - Density: 68.38/km^{2} (177.1/sq mi)
- Demonym: Monteacutesi
- Time zone: UTC+1 (CET)
  - Summer (DST): UTC+2 (CEST)
- Postal code: 12040
- Dialing code: 0173
- Website: Official website

Monteu Roero is a comune (municipality) in the Province of Cuneo in the Italian region Piedmont, located about 35 km (22 mi) southeast of Turin and about 50 km (31 mi) northeast of Cuneo.

Monteu Roero borders the following municipalities: Canale, Ceresole Alba, Montaldo Roero, Pralormo, Santo Stefano Roero, and Vezza d'Alba.

The main economic activities are the production of wine and chestnuts.

== History ==
In ancient times the site was known as Monte Acuto ("Sharp Mount"). In 1041 emperor Henry III gave it to the bishops of Asti, who, a century later, ceded it to the count Guy of Biandrate, who had the first castle built here. The latter's family held the castle for three centuries until 1299 when, defeated by Asti's troops, they sold it to the Roero (or Rotari) family. The current castle was built by new feudataries in the 15th century on the former one's ruin.

The castle passed to the house of Savoy in 1784.

== Main sights ==
- The castle, including 14th centuries capitals in the armory and 17th-century frescoes and decorations.
- Church of San Bernardino, enlarged in Baroque times.

== People ==
- Guido Bodrato (born 1933), politician
