= Guarene Castle =

Castle in Piedmont, Italy

- Castello di Guarene
- Guarene, Piedmont, Italy
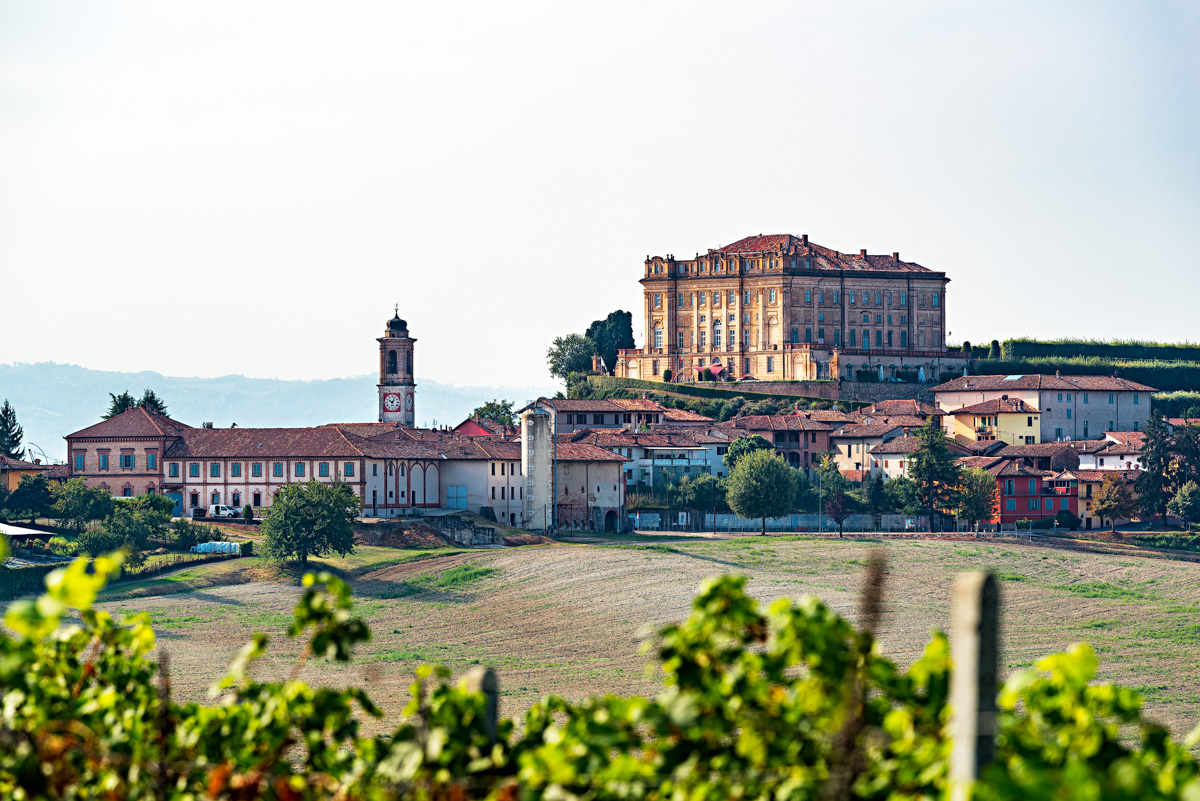
- Guarene Castle in 2018

Site information
- Type: Castle

Location
- Coordinates: 44°44′20.54″N 8°01′59.3″E

Guarene Castle (Italian: Castello di Guarene) is a castle located in Guarene, Piedmont, Italy.

== History ==
The castle developed as a defensive fortress during the Middle Ages. In the 18th century, Count Carlo Giacinto Roero largely rebuilt the medieval manor to create a new Baroque residence that would serve as a summer residence; the works began in 1726 under his supervision, even through correspondence from Turin. After Carlo Giacinto's death, his sons completed the construction. In 1773, the king and the queen of Sardinia visited the castle, leaving traces of this event in the furnishings. In 1899, the property passed to the Provana di Collegno family, while in 2011 the building was acquired by new owners who transformed it into a luxury hotel, preserving a museum dedicated to its history.

== Description ==
The castle, standing atop a hill surrounded by gardens, features Piedmontese Baroque architecture influenced by the style of Filippo Juvarra, a friend and mentor of Count Roero. The layout of the building is characterized by two lateral projecting wings.
