= Santa Vittoria d'Alba =

- Comune
- Comune di Santa Vittoria d'Alba
- Location within Italy Location within Piedmont
- Coordinates: 44°42′N 7°56′E
- Country: Italy
- Region: Piedmont
- Province: Province of Cuneo (CN)

Area
  - Total: 10.1 km^{2} (3.9 sq mi)

Population (Dec. 2004)
  - Total: 2,591
  - Density: 257/km^{2} (664/sq mi)
- Time zone: UTC+1 (CET)
  - Summer (DST): UTC+2 (CEST)
- Postal code: 12069
- Dialing code: 0172

Santa Vittoria d'Alba is a comune (municipality) in the Province of Cuneo in the Italian region Piedmont, located about 45 kilometres (28 mi) southeast of Turin and about 45 kilometres northeast of Cuneo. As of 31 December 2004, it had a population of 2,591 and an area of 10.1 square kilometres (3.9 mi^{2}).

Santa Vittoria d'Alba borders the following municipalities: Bra, Monticello d'Alba, Pocapaglia, Roddi, and Verduno.

== Demographic evolution ==
Historical population

Year	Pop.	±%
1861	1,361	—
1871	1,435	+5.4%
1881	1,428	−0.5%
1901	1,551	+8.6%
1911	1,823	+17.5%

Year	Pop.	±%
1921	1,832	+0.5%
1931	1,566	−14.5%
1936	1,490	−4.9%
1951	1,521	+2.1%
1961	1,648	+8.3%

Year	Pop.	±%
1971	1,809	+9.8%
1981	1,979	+9.4%
1991	2,403	+21.4%
2001	2,512	+4.5%

Source: Data from ISTAT

== Twin towns ==
Santa Vittoria d'Alba is twinned with:

- Vers-Pont-du-Gard, France (1973)
