= Pralormo =

- Comune
- Comune di Pralormo
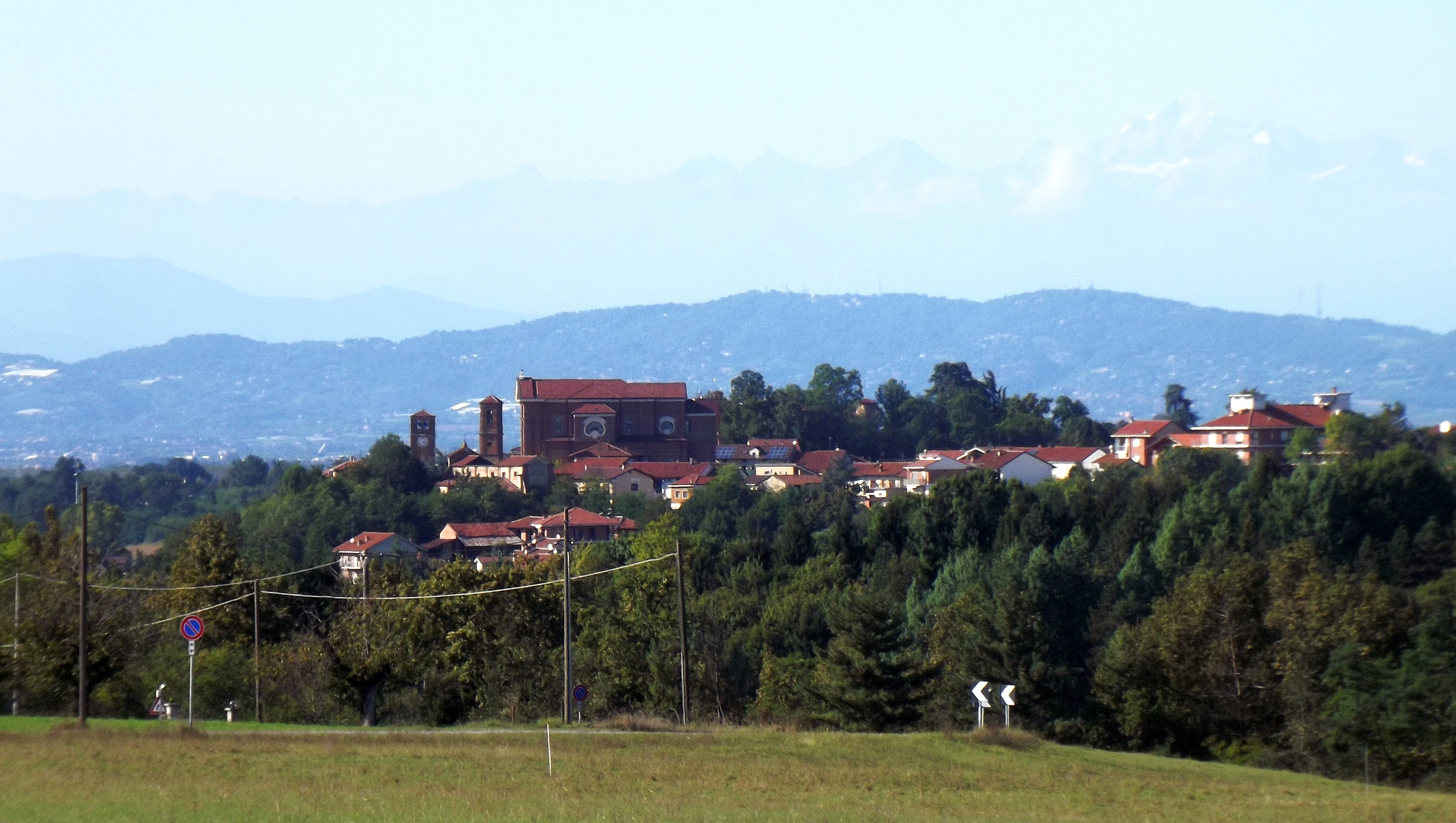

- Location within Italy Location within Piedmont
- Coordinates: 44°52′N 7°54′E
- Country: Italy
- Region: Piedmont
- Metropolitan city: Turin (TO)

Government
  - Mayor: Lorenzo Fogliato

Area
  - Total: 29.8 km^{2} (11.5 sq mi)
- Elevation: 303 m (994 ft)

Population (31 December 2010)
  - Total: 1,939
  - Density: 65.1/km^{2} (169/sq mi)
- Demonym: Pralormesi
- Time zone: UTC+1 (CET)
  - Summer (DST): UTC+2 (CEST)
- Postal code: 10040
- Dialing code: 011

Pralormo is a comune (municipality) in the Metropolitan City of Turin in the Italian region Piedmont, about 25 km southeast of Turin.

Pralormo borders the following municipalities: Poirino, Cellarengo, Montà, Ceresole Alba, Santo Stefano Roero, and Monteu Roero.

== See also ==
- Lake della Spina
