= Piobesi d'Alba =

- Comune
- Comune di Piobesi d'Alba
- Location within Italy Location within Piedmont
- Coordinates: 44°44′N 7°59′E
- Country: Italy
- Region: Piedmont
- Province: Province of Cuneo (CN)

Area
  - Total: 4.0 km^{2} (1.5 sq mi)

Population (December 2004)
  - Total: 1,170
  - Density: 290/km^{2} (760/sq mi)
- Time zone: UTC+1 (CET)
  - Summer (DST): UTC+2 (CEST)
- Postal code: 12040
- Dialing code: 0173

Piobesi d'Alba is a comune (municipality) in the Province of Cuneo in the Italian region Piedmont, located about 45 kilometres (28 mi) southeast of Turin and about 50 kilometres (31 mi) northeast of Cuneo. As of 31 December 2004, it had a population of 1,170 and an area of 4.0 square kilometres (1.5 mi^{2}).

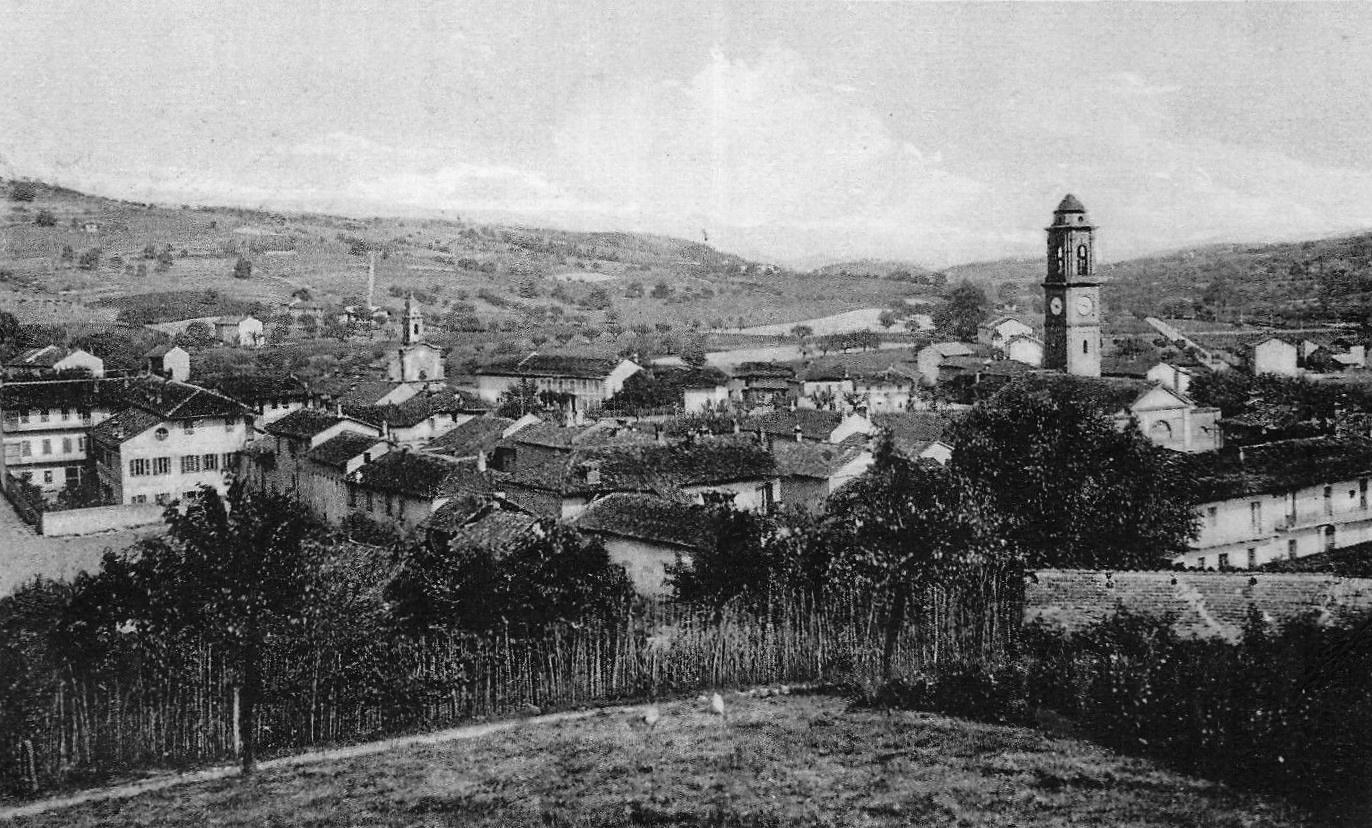
Postcard

Piobesi d'Alba borders the following municipalities: Alba, Corneliano d'Alba, and Guarene.

== Demographic evolution ==
Historical population

Year	Pop.	±%
1861	514	—
1871	537	+4.5%
1881	569	+6.0%
1901	573	+0.7%
1911	684	+19.4%

Year	Pop.	±%
1921	650	−5.0%
1931	709	+9.1%
1936	617	−13.0%
1951	552	−10.5%
1961	489	−11.4%

Year	Pop.	±%
1971	443	−9.4%
1981	591	+33.4%
1991	913	+54.5%
2001	1,027	+12.5%

Source: Data from ISTAT
