= Pocapaglia =

Pocapaglia Pocapaja (Piedmontese)
- Comune
- Comune di Pocapaglia
- Location within Italy Location within Piedmont
- Coordinates: 44°42′N 7°53′E
- Country: Italy
- Region: Piedmont
- Province: Province of Cuneo (CN)
- Frazioni: Macellai, America dei Boschi, Saliceto

Government
  - Mayor: Giuseppe Dacomo (Civic List)

Area
  - Total: 17.4 km^{2} (6.7 sq mi)

Population (1-1-2017)
  - Total: 3,311
  - Density: 190/km^{2} (493/sq mi)
- Demonym: Pocapagliese(i)
- Time zone: UTC+1 (CET)
  - Summer (DST): UTC+2 (CEST)
- Postal code: 12060
- Dialing code: 0172
- Website: www.comune.pocapaglia.cn.it

Pocapaglia (Piedmontese: Pocapaja) is a comune (municipality) in the Province of Cuneo in the Italian region Piedmont, located about 45 kilometres (28 mi) southeast of Turin and about 45 kilometres (28 mi) northeast of Cuneo. As of 1-1-2017, it had a population of 3,311 and an area of 17.4 square kilometres (6.7 mi^{2}).

Pocapaglia borders the following municipalities: Bra, Monticello d'Alba, Sanfrè, Santa Vittoria d'Alba, and Sommariva Perno.

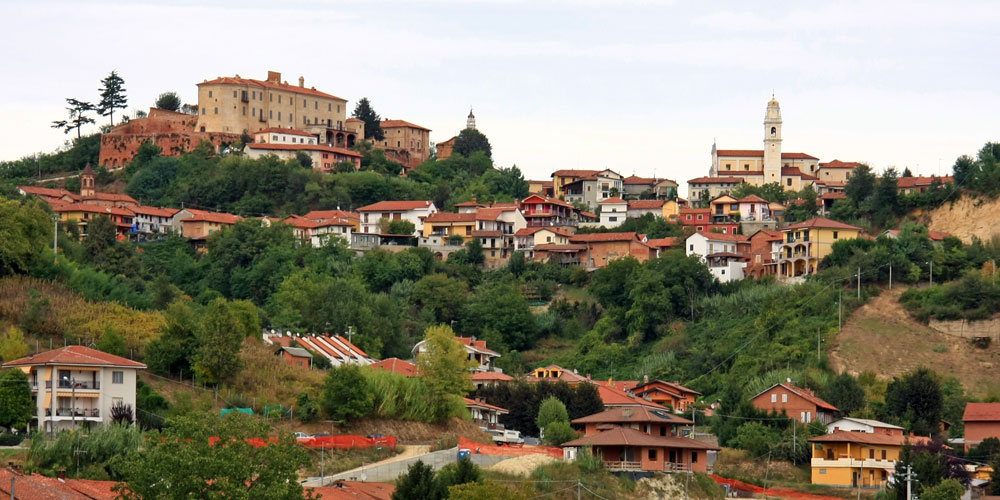
Panorama of Pocapaglia

== Demographic evolution ==
Historical population

Year	Pop.	±%
1861	1,973	—
1871	2,082	+5.5%
1881	2,221	+6.7%
1901	2,347	+5.7%
1911	2,461	+4.9%

Year	Pop.	±%
1921	2,419	−1.7%
1931	2,490	+2.9%
1936	2,597	+4.3%
1951	2,416	−7.0%
1961	2,175	−10.0%

Year	Pop.	±%
1971	2,042	−6.1%
1981	2,084	+2.1%
1991	2,296	+10.2%
2001	2,758	+20.1%

Source: Data from ISTAT
