= Lake della Spina =

Artificial lake in Pralormo, Italy

Lake Spina
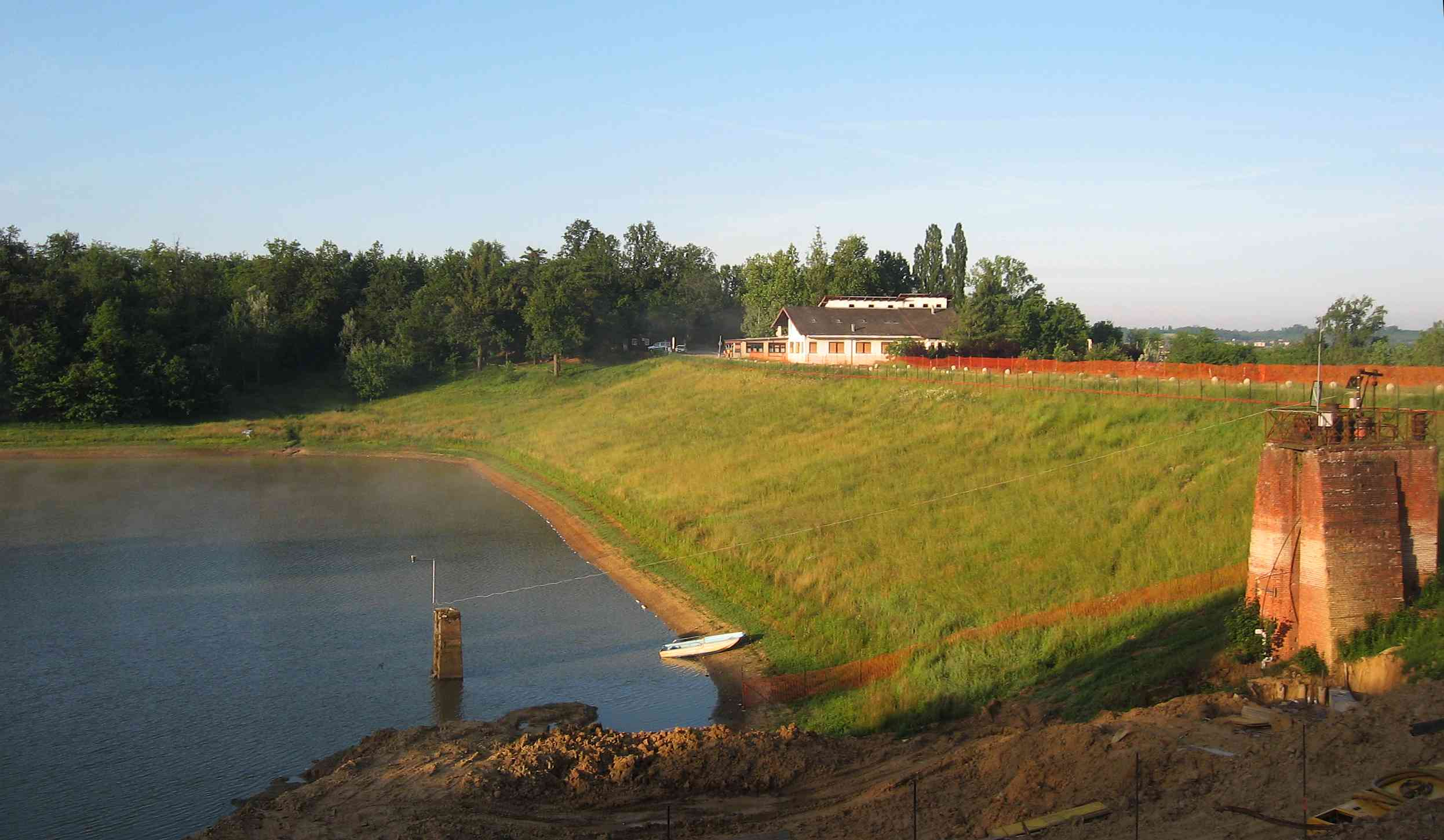
- Interactive map of Lake Spina
- Location: Pralormo, Metropolitan City of Turin, Piedmont, Italy
- Coordinates: 44°51′N 7°54′E
- Type: Artificial lake
- Primary inflows: Rio Torto, Rissarasco
- Islands: None

Lake Spina is an artificial reservoir located 288 m (945 ft) above sea level in the municipality of Pralormo, Metropolitan City of Turin, Italy.

== Description ==
The basin, built for irrigation purposes, has a surface area of 0.16 km^{2} (0.062 sq mi). The dam, made of earth and loose materials, measures 20 m (66 ft) in height, 6 m (20 ft) in width at the crown, and 190 m (620 ft) in length. The lake belongs to the hydrographic basin of the Rioverde (a tributary of the Banna) and receives the waters of the Rio Torto and the Rissarasco, which were once channeled through a masonry tunnel no longer in use. The municipal seat of Pralormo is located about 1.5 km (0.93 mi) northwest of the body of water. The lake and the surrounding forests represent a precious environmental heritage for the surrounding territory.

== History ==
The lake takes its name from the homonymous sanctuary. The lake was built in 1827; the commissioners of the works were Count Carlo Bernardi of Pralormo and Marquis Carlo Emanuele Ferrero della Marmora, and the work was declared of public utility with the Patent Letters of Charles Albert of Sardinia on 28 August 1827.

The direction of the works was entrusted to the hydraulic engineer Cavaliere Barabino, who created a remarkable work not only for its size but also for the ingenious irrigation mechanism with which he equipped the reservoir. Barabino indeed created an irrigation system that, through a float, collected only the most superficial and most fertile water and avoided cutting the dam every time irrigation was necessary.

After the flood of 1994 and the damage to the earthfill dam, the level of the basin is kept lower than in the past, and the surface of the water body has consequently decreased, especially in its southeastern part.

For the safety of the reservoir, a commissioner was appointed: the interventions for the realization of the discharge organs, for the consolidation of the dam body, and for the reopening of the adduction galleries began in December 2008, with completion expected in 2010.

== Traditions ==
The community of Pralormo celebrates the Madonna of Spina on the occasion of the solemnity of the Assumption and Saint Donatus with a procession that starts from Lake Spina and ends at the homonymous Sanctuary with the celebration of Holy Mass. Among the numerous ex-votos contained in the Sanctuary, a plaque affixed on 1 January 1995 recalls the narrowly averted danger of the collapse of the lake's dam during the flood of November 1994.

== Bibliography ==
- Atlante dei laghi Piemontesi [Atlas of Piedmontese Lakes] (in Italian). Regione Piemonte - Direzione Pianificazione delle Risorse Idriche. 2003.
- Rosso, Maurizio; Fabio Santo. "Primi risultati della consulenza tecnica per la diga di Pralormo (Lago della Spina)" [Preliminary results of the technical consultancy for the dam of Pralormo (Lake Spina)] (PDF) (in Italian).
- Appendino, O. (1995). Il Santuario e il monastero della Beata Vergine della Spina [The Sanctuary and Monastery of the Blessed Virgin of Spina] (in Italian). Pralormo.
