= Magliano Alfieri =

- Comune
- Comune di Magliano Alfieri
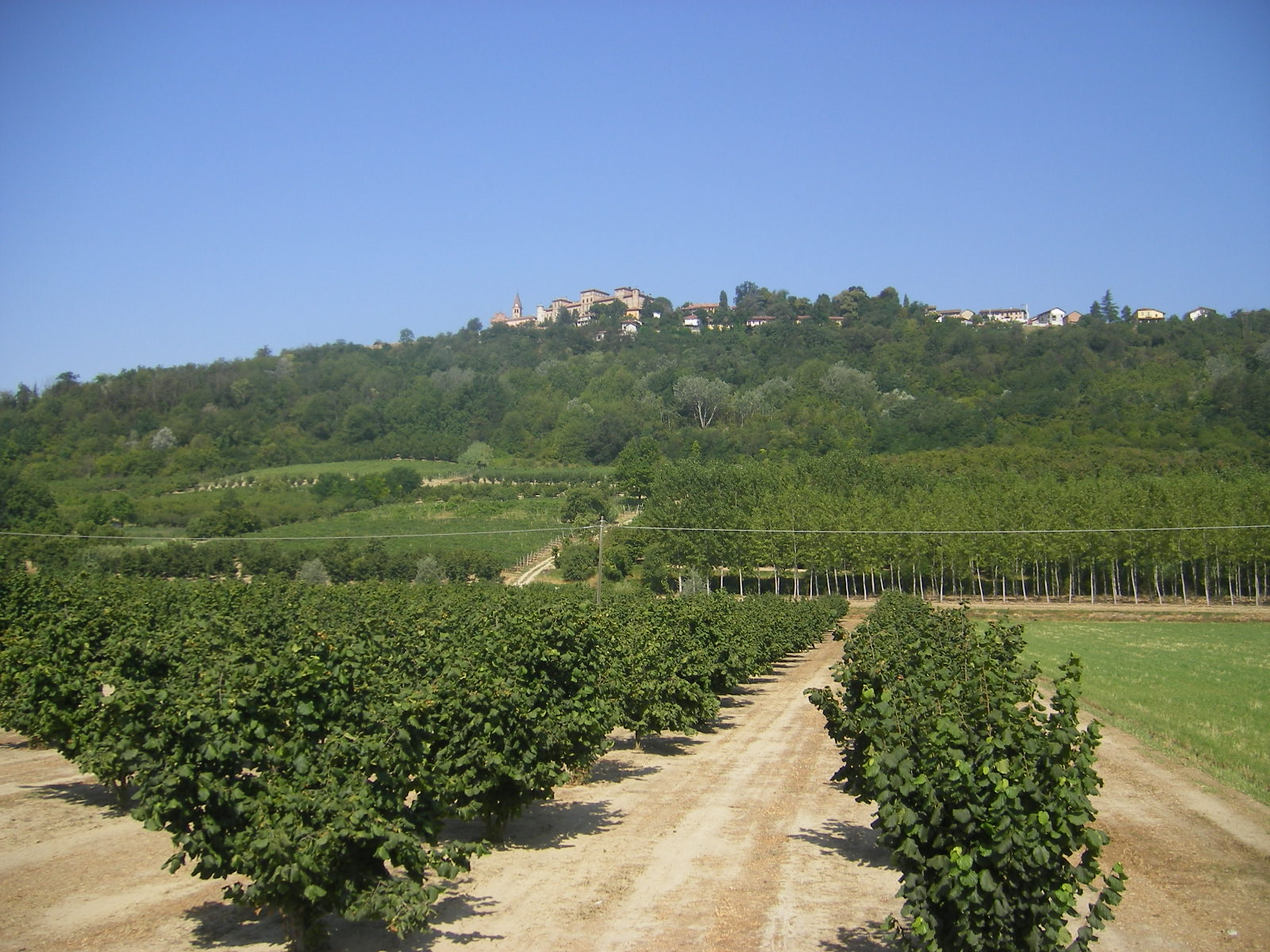

- Location within Italy Location within Piedmont
- Coordinates: 44°46′N 8°4′E
- Country: Italy
- Region: Piedmont
- Province: Province of Cuneo (CN)

Area
  - Total: 9.5 km^{2} (3.7 sq mi)

Population (Dec. 2004)
  - Total: 1,726
  - Density: 180/km^{2} (470/sq mi)
- Time zone: UTC+1 (CET)
  - Summer (DST): UTC+2 (CEST)
- Postal code: 12050
- Dialing code: 0173

Magliano Alfieri is a comune (municipality) in the Province of Cuneo in the Italian region Piedmont, located about 45 kilometres (28 mi) southeast of Turin and about 60 kilometres (37 mi) northeast of Cuneo. As of 31 December 2004, it had a population of 1,726 and an area of 9.5 square kilometres (3.7 mi^{2}).

Magliano Alfieri borders the following municipalities: Castagnito, Castagnole delle Lanze, Castellinaldo, Govone, Neive, and Priocca.

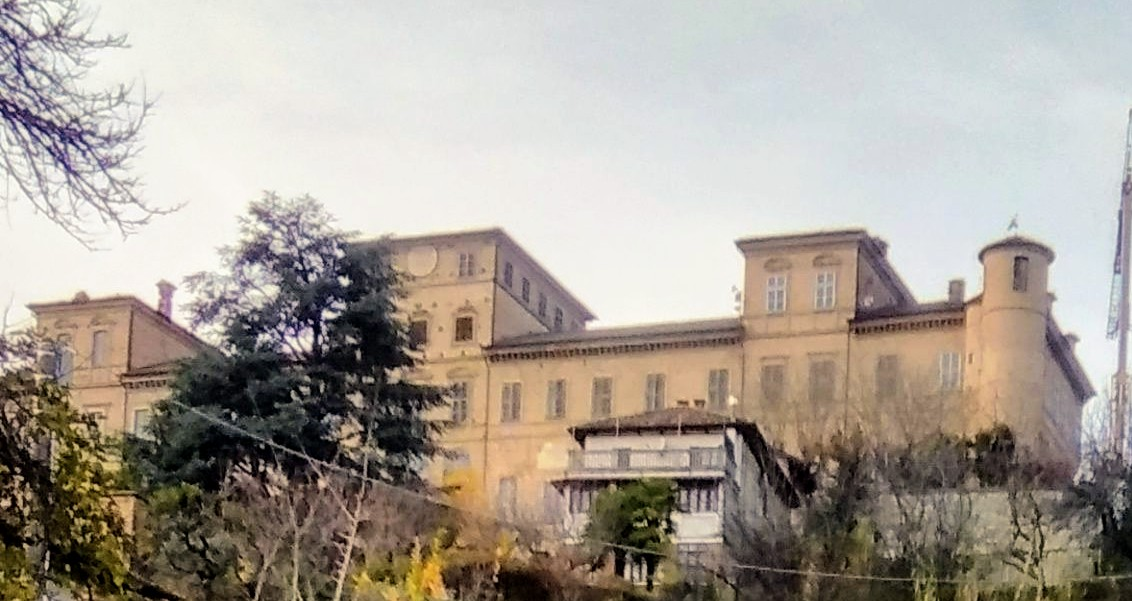
Panorama of Magliano Alfieri castello

== Demographic evolution ==
Historical population

Year	Pop.	±%
1861	1,825	—
1871	1,937	+6.1%
1881	1,985	+2.5%
1901	1,997	+0.6%
1911	2,060	+3.2%

Year	Pop.	±%
1921	2,134	+3.6%
1931	1,880	−11.9%
1936	1,991	+5.9%
1951	1,560	−21.6%
1961	1,364	−12.6%

Year	Pop.	±%
1971	1,453	+6.5%
1981	1,473	+1.4%
1991	1,555	+5.6%
2001	1,674	+7.7%

Source: Data from ISTAT
