= Placido Mossello =

Italian painter (1835–1894)

Placido Mossello (1835–1894) was an Italian painter active in Turin.

He was born in Montà d'Alba. He painted decoration in the way of frescoes and painted furniture, including a cabinet painted in tempera exhibited along with Francesco Carando. He painted Flos Florum, exhibited in 1880; and an oil painting of La Madonna, exhibited in 1887 at Venice. Along with his brother, Domenico Mossello, he frescoed Putti (1864) in the ballroom of Royal Apartments of the Castello de La Mandria, found in the La Mandria Regional Park, located northwest of Turin. He also frescoed ceilings (1878) in Palazzo Marenco of Turin. He also worked as an architect, designing the hexagonal Piloni, which are small chapels-shrines (1903), housing terra-cotta scenes of the Via Crucis at the Santuario dei Piloni at Montà d'Alba.

His two daughters, Luigia and Romana Mossello, married Carlo Bartolomeo Musso and his brother Secondo. Carlo Bartolomeo (1863–1935) was a sculptor trained at the Accademia Albertina.
