= Province of Cuneo =

Coordinates: 44°23′N 7°33′E

Province of Cuneo Provincia di Cuneo (Italian) Provincia ëd Coni (Piedmontese)
- Province
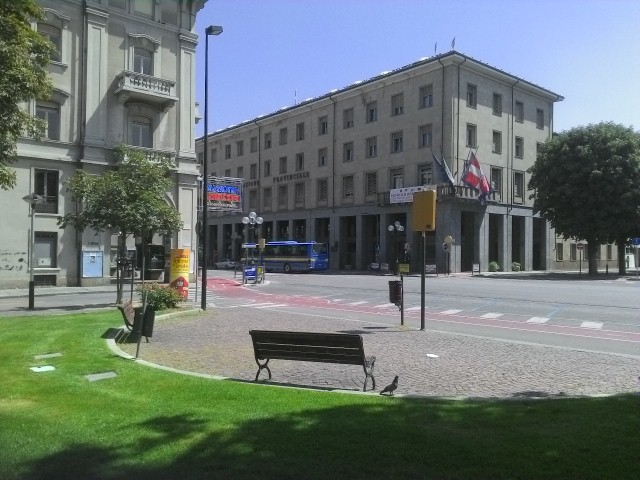
- The provincial seat

- Flag Coat of arms

- Location of the province of Cuneo in Italy
- Country: Italy
- Region: Piedmont
- Capital(s): Cuneo
- Municipalities: 250

Government
  - President: Luca Robaldo

Area
  - Total: 6,894.94 km^{2} (2,662.15 sq mi)

Population (2026)
  - Total: 582,109
  - Density: 84.4255/km^{2} (218.661/sq mi)

GDP
  - Total: €17.987 billion (2015)
  - Per capita: €30,423 (2015)
- Time zone: UTC+1 (CET)
  - Summer (DST): UTC+2 (CEST)
- Postal code: 12100
- Telephone prefix: 0171
- Vehicle registration: CN
- ISTAT code: 004
- Website: www.provincia.cuneo.it

Map of the province of Cuneo

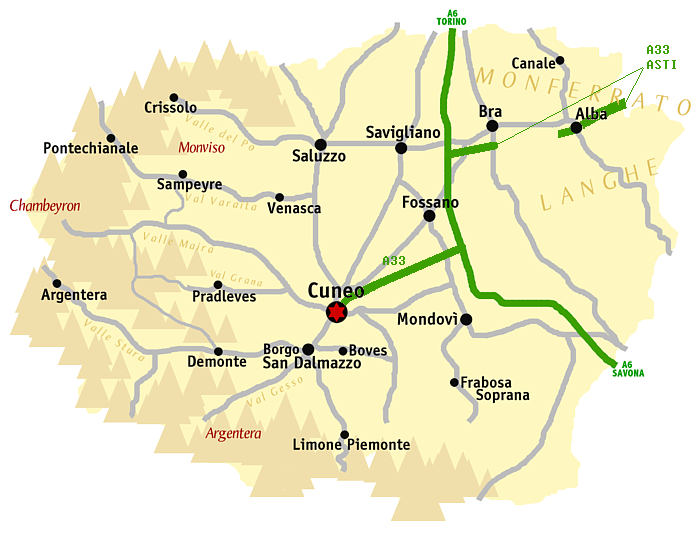
Map of the province of Cuneo

Map of municipalities of province of Cuneo

The Province of Cuneo (Italian: provincia di Cuneo; Piedmontese: provincia ëd Coni) is a province in the region of Piedmont in northern Italy. To the west, it borders the French region of Provence-Alpes-Côte d'Azur (departments of Alpes-Maritimes, Alpes-de-Haute-Provence and Hautes-Alpes), to the north the Metropolitan City of Turin, to the east the province of Asti and to the south the Ligurian provinces of Savona and Imperia. It has a population of 582,109 in an area of 6,894.94 square kilometres (2,662.15 sq mi) across its 250 municipalities.

It is also known as la Provincia Granda (Piedmontese for 'The Big Province'), because it is the largest province in Piedmont and the fourth-largest in Italy (following Sassari, South Tyrol and Foggia). Briga Marittima and Tenda were part of this province before their cession to France in 1947.

== Municipalities ==
The province has 247 municipalities:

- Acceglio
- Aisone
- Alba
- Albaretto della Torre
- Alto
- Argentera
- Arguello
- Bagnasco
- Bagnolo Piemonte
- Baldissero d'Alba
- Barbaresco
- Barge
- Barolo
- Bastia Mondovì
- Battifollo
- Beinette
- Bellino
- Belvedere Langhe
- Bene Vagienna
- Benevello
- Bergolo
- Bernezzo
- Bonvicino
- Borgo San Dalmazzo
- Borgomale
- Bosia
- Bossolasco
- Boves
- Bra
- Briaglia
- Briga Alta
- Brondello
- Brossasco
- Busca
- Camerana
- Canale
- Canosio
- Caprauna
- Caraglio
- Caramagna Piemonte
- Cardè
- Carrù
- Cartignano
- Casalgrasso
- Castagnito
- Casteldelfino
- Castelletto Stura
- Castelletto Uzzone
- Castellinaldo
- Castellino Tanaro
- Castelmagno
- Castelnuovo di Ceva
- Castiglione Falletto
- Castiglione Tinella
- Castino
- Cavallerleone
- Cavallermaggiore
- Celle di Macra
- Centallo
- Ceresole Alba
- Cerretto Langhe
- Cervasca
- Cervere
- Ceva
- Cherasco
- Chiusa di Pesio
- Cigliè
- Cissone
- Clavesana
- Corneliano d'Alba
- Cortemilia
- Cossano Belbo
- Costigliole Saluzzo
- Cravanzana
- Crissolo
- Cuneo
- Demonte
- Diano d'Alba
- Dogliani
- Dronero
- Elva
- Entracque
- Envie
- Farigliano
- Faule
- Feisoglio
- Fossano
- Frabosa Soprana
- Frabosa Sottana
- Frassino
- Gaiola
- Gambasca
- Garessio
- Genola
- Gorzegno
- Gottasecca
- Govone
- Grinzane Cavour
- Guarene
- Igliano
- Isasca
- La Morra
- Lagnasco
- Lequio Berria
- Lequio Tanaro
- Lesegno
- Levice
- Limone Piemonte
- Lisio
- Macra
- Magliano Alfieri
- Magliano Alpi
- Mango
- Manta
- Marene
- Margarita
- Marmora
- Marsaglia
- Martiniana Po
- Melle
- Moiola
- Mombarcaro
- Mombasiglio
- Monastero di Vasco
- Monasterolo Casotto
- Monasterolo di Savigliano
- Monchiero
- Mondovì
- Monesiglio
- Monforte d'Alba
- Montà
- Montaldo di Mondovì
- Montaldo Roero
- Montanera
- Montelupo Albese
- Montemale di Cuneo
- Monterosso Grana
- Monteu Roero
- Montezemolo
- Monticello d'Alba
- Moretta
- Morozzo
- Murazzano
- Murello
- Narzole
- Neive
- Neviglie
- Niella Belbo
- Niella Tanaro
- Novello
- Nucetto
- Oncino
- Ormea
- Ostana
- Paesana
- Pagno
- Pamparato
- Paroldo
- Perletto
- Perlo
- Peveragno
- Pezzolo Valle Uzzone
- Pianfei
- Piasco
- Pietraporzio
- Piobesi d'Alba
- Piozzo
- Pocapaglia
- Polonghera
- Pontechianale
- Pradleves
- Prazzo
- Priero
- Priocca
- Priola
- Prunetto
- Racconigi
- Revello
- Rifreddo
- Rittana
- Roaschia
- Roascio
- Robilante
- Roburent
- Rocca Cigliè
- Rocca de' Baldi
- Roccabruna
- Roccaforte Mondovì
- Roccasparvera
- Roccavione
- Rocchetta Belbo
- Roddi
- Roddino
- Rodello
- Rossana
- Ruffia
- Sale delle Langhe
- Sale San Giovanni
- Saliceto
- Salmour
- Saluzzo
- Sambuco
- Sampeyre
- San Benedetto Belbo
- San Damiano Macra
- San Michele Mondovì
- Sanfrè
- Sanfront
- Sant'Albano Stura
- Santa Vittoria d'Alba
- Santo Stefano Belbo
- Santo Stefano Roero
- Savigliano
- Scagnello
- Scarnafigi
- Serralunga d'Alba
- Serravalle Langhe
- Sinio
- Somano
- Sommariva del Bosco
- Sommariva Perno
- Stroppo
- Tarantasca
- Torre Bormida
- Torre Mondovì
- Torre San Giorgio
- Torresina
- Treiso
- Trezzo Tinella
- Trinità
- Valdieri
- Valgrana
- Valloriate
- Venasca
- Verduno
- Vernante
- Verzuolo
- Vezza d'Alba
- Vicoforte
- Vignolo
- Villafalletto
- Villanova Mondovì
- Villanova Solaro
- Villar San Costanzo
- Vinadio
- Viola
- Vottignasco

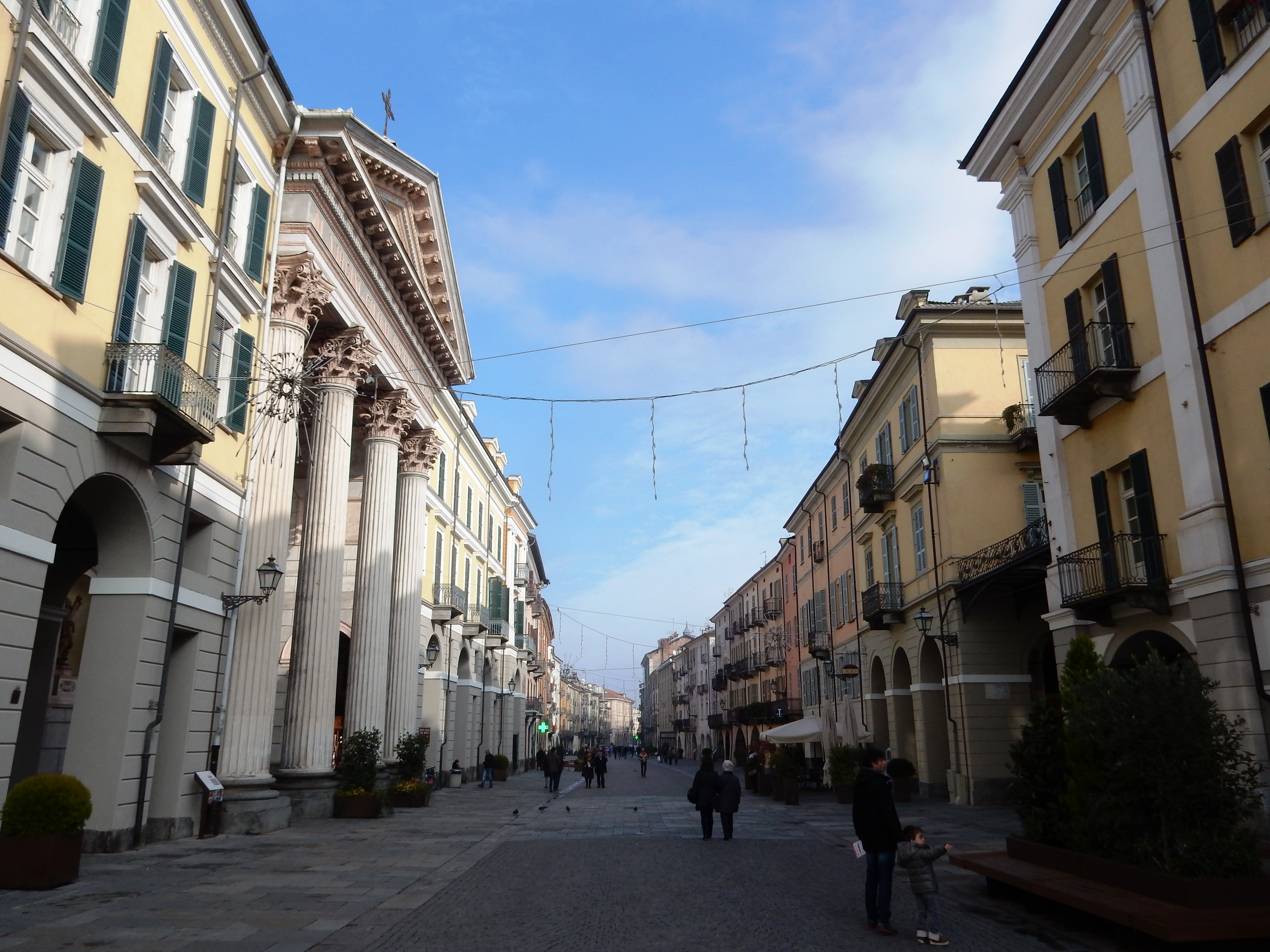
Cuneo

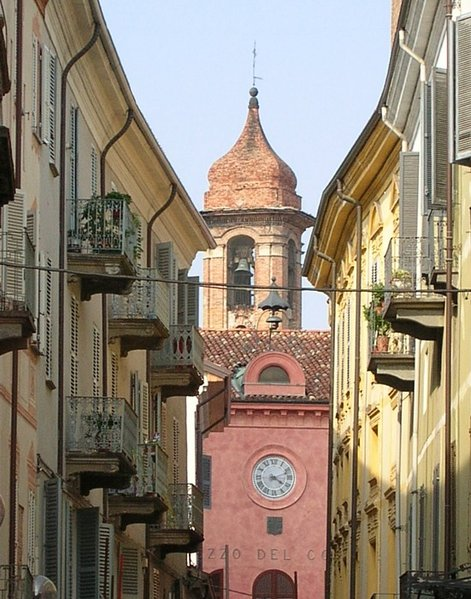
Alba

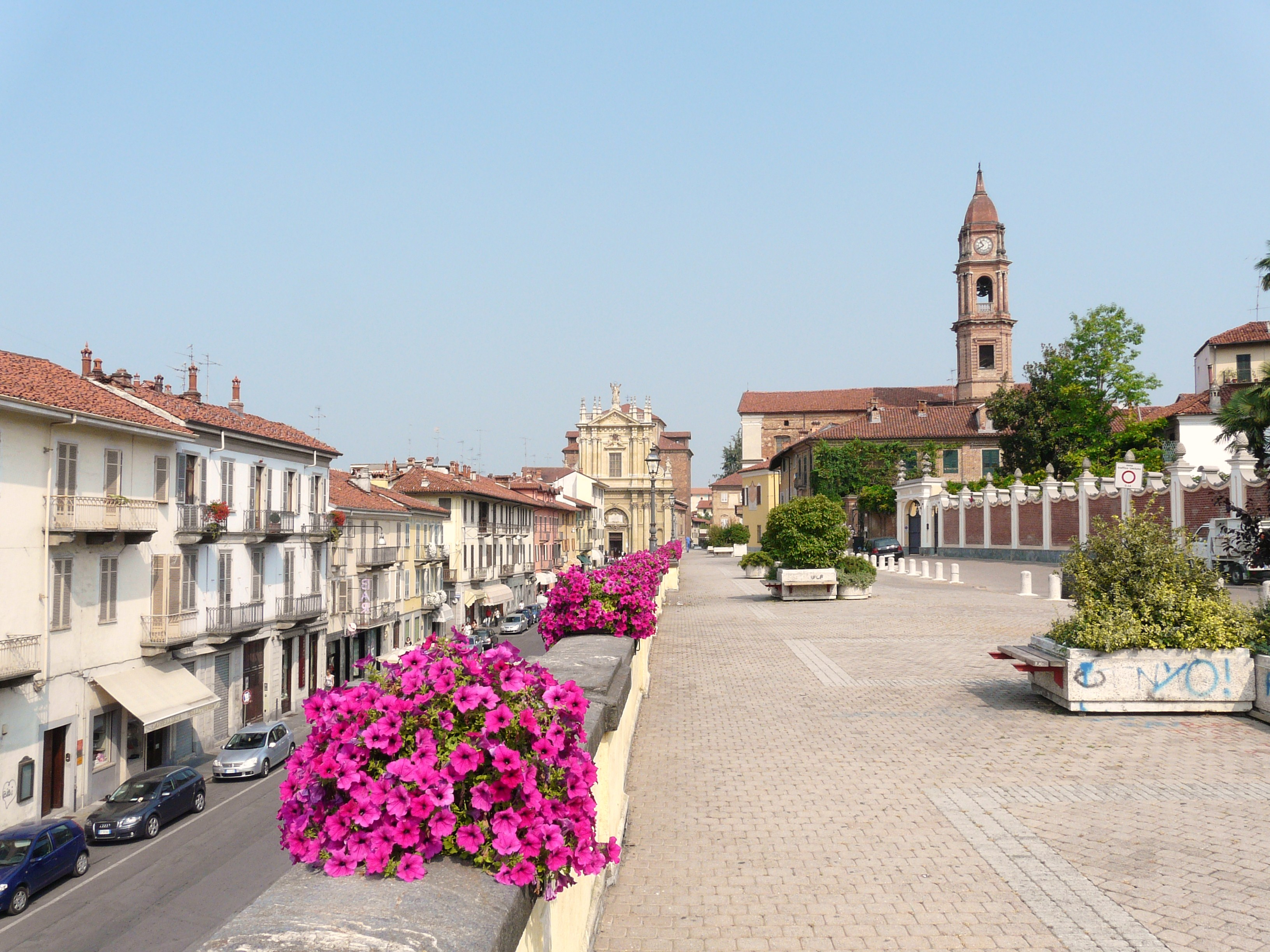
Bra

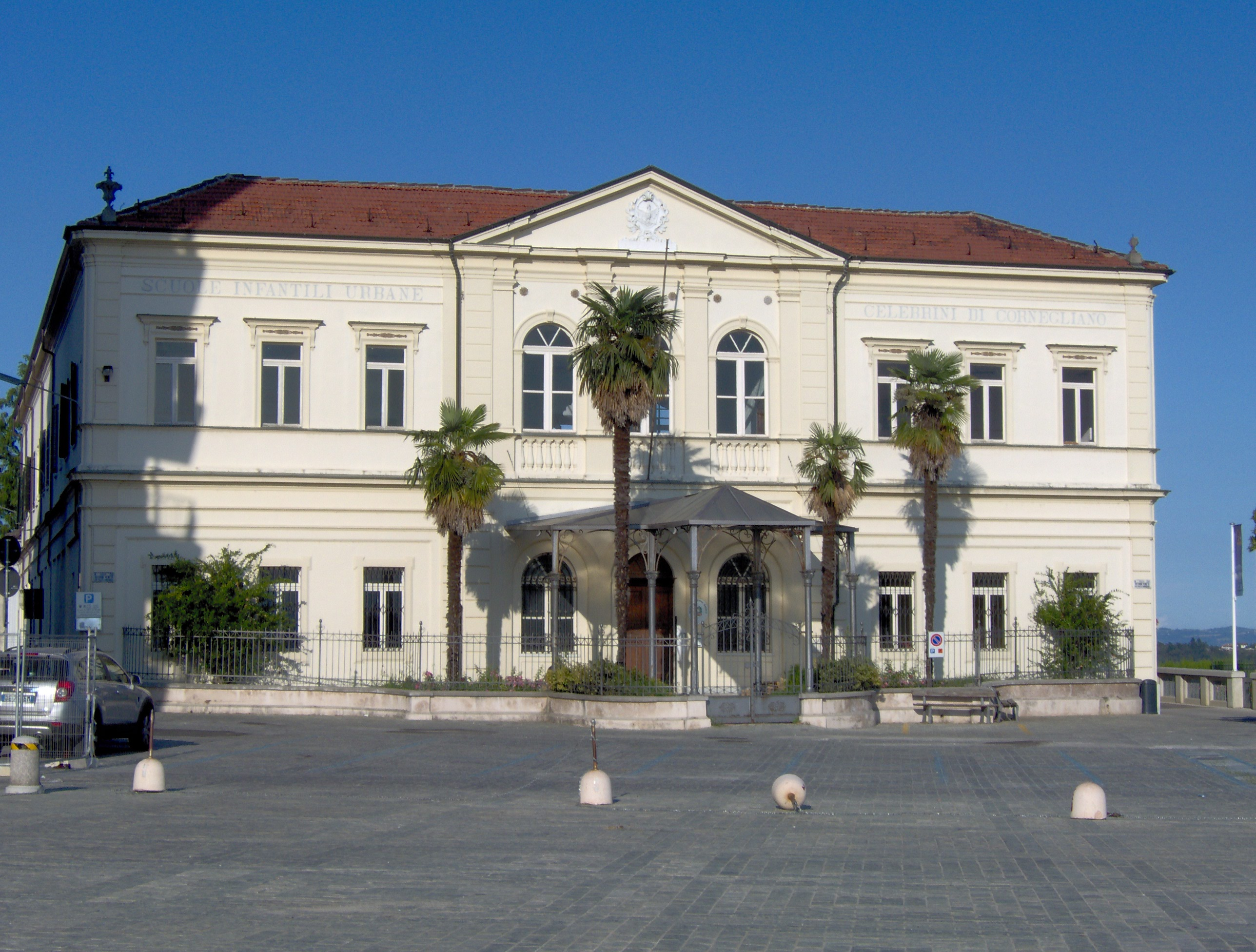
Fossano

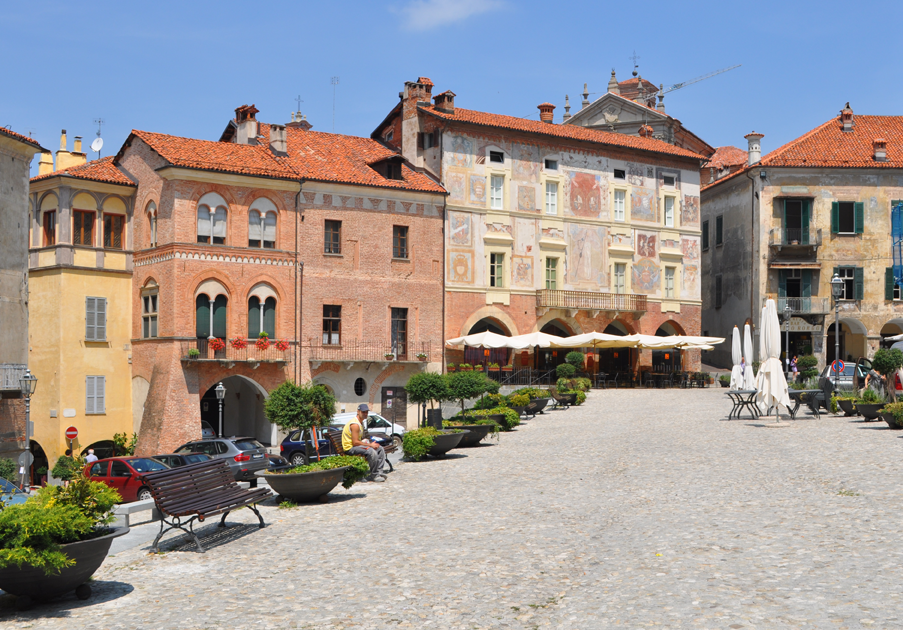
Mondovì

== Demographics ==
As of 2026, the population is 582,109, of which 49.9% are male, and 50.1% are female. Minors make up 15% of the population, and seniors make up 25.7%.

Historical population

| Year | Pop. | ±% |
|---|---|---|
| 1861 | 623,401 | — |
| 1871 | 643,219 | +3.2% |
| 1881 | 660,707 | +2.7% |
| 1901 | 666,510 | +0.9% |
| 1911 | 667,863 | +0.2% |
| 1921 | 661,111 | −1.0% |
| 1931 | 637,247 | −3.6% |
| 1936 | 604,638 | −5.1% |

| Year | Pop. | ±% |
|---|---|---|
| 1951 | 580,478 | −4.0% |
| 1961 | 536,356 | −7.6% |
| 1971 | 540,504 | +0.8% |
| 1981 | 548,452 | +1.5% |
| 1991 | 547,234 | −0.2% |
| 2001 | 556,330 | +1.7% |
| 2011 | 586,378 | +5.4% |
| 2021 | 580,155 | −1.1% |

Source: ISTAT

=== Immigration ===
As of 2025, immigrants make up 13.8% of the population. The 5 largest foreign countries of birth are Albania, Romania, Morocco, North Macedonia, and India.

== Economy ==
Headquarters of Ferrero SpA in Alba

Companies active in the province include:

- Michelin in Mondovì
- Miroglio in Alba
- Ferrero SpA in Alba
- Maina in Fossano
- Balocco in Fossano
- Merlo in San Defendente (Cervasca)
- Arpa industriale in Bra
- Bottero in Cuneo
- Mondo in Alba
- Mtm-Brc in Cherasco
- Abet in Bra
- Edizioni San Paolo in Alba

Many important industrial groups have branches in the province: Michelin (Cuneo and Fossano), Saint-Gobain (Savigliano), Valeo (Mondovì), Asahi Glass Co. (Cuneo), ITT (Barge), Diageo (Santa Vittoria d'Alba) and Nestlé (Moretta).

Cuneo is also the land of important wines, mostly produced in the Langhe and Roero hills, such as Barbaresco, Barolo, Nebbiolo, Barbera and many others.

== Transport ==
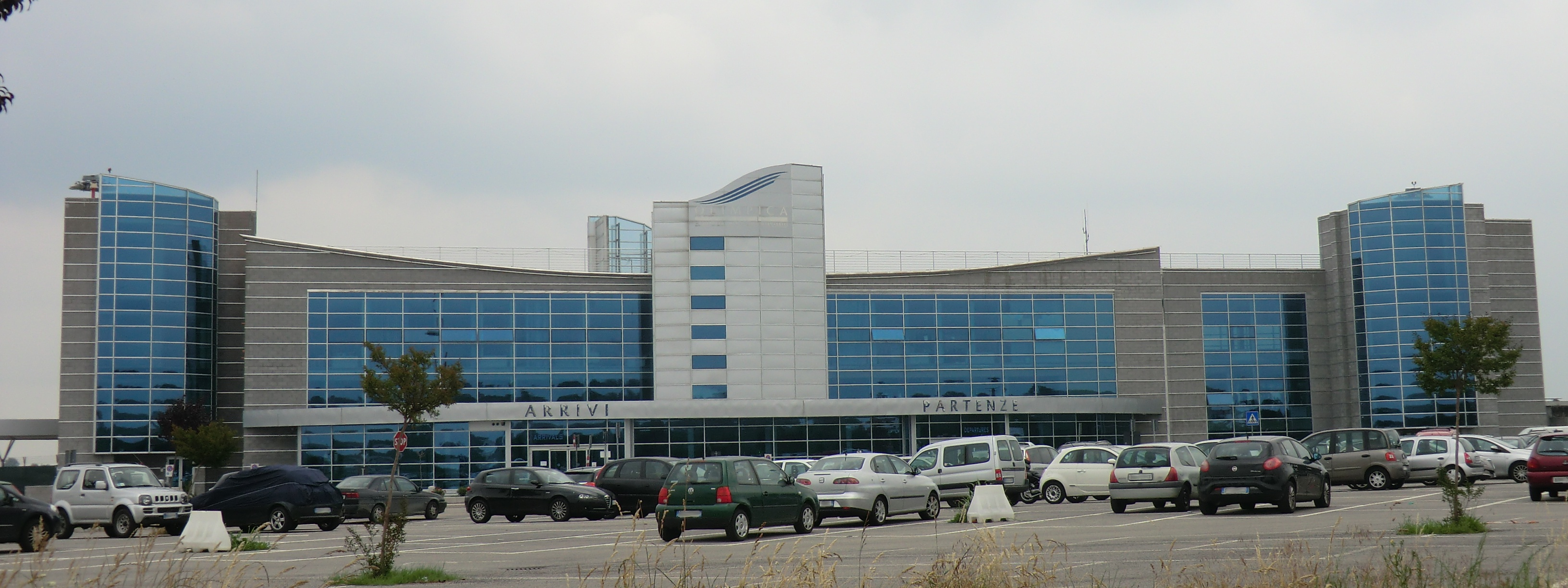
Cuneo International Airport

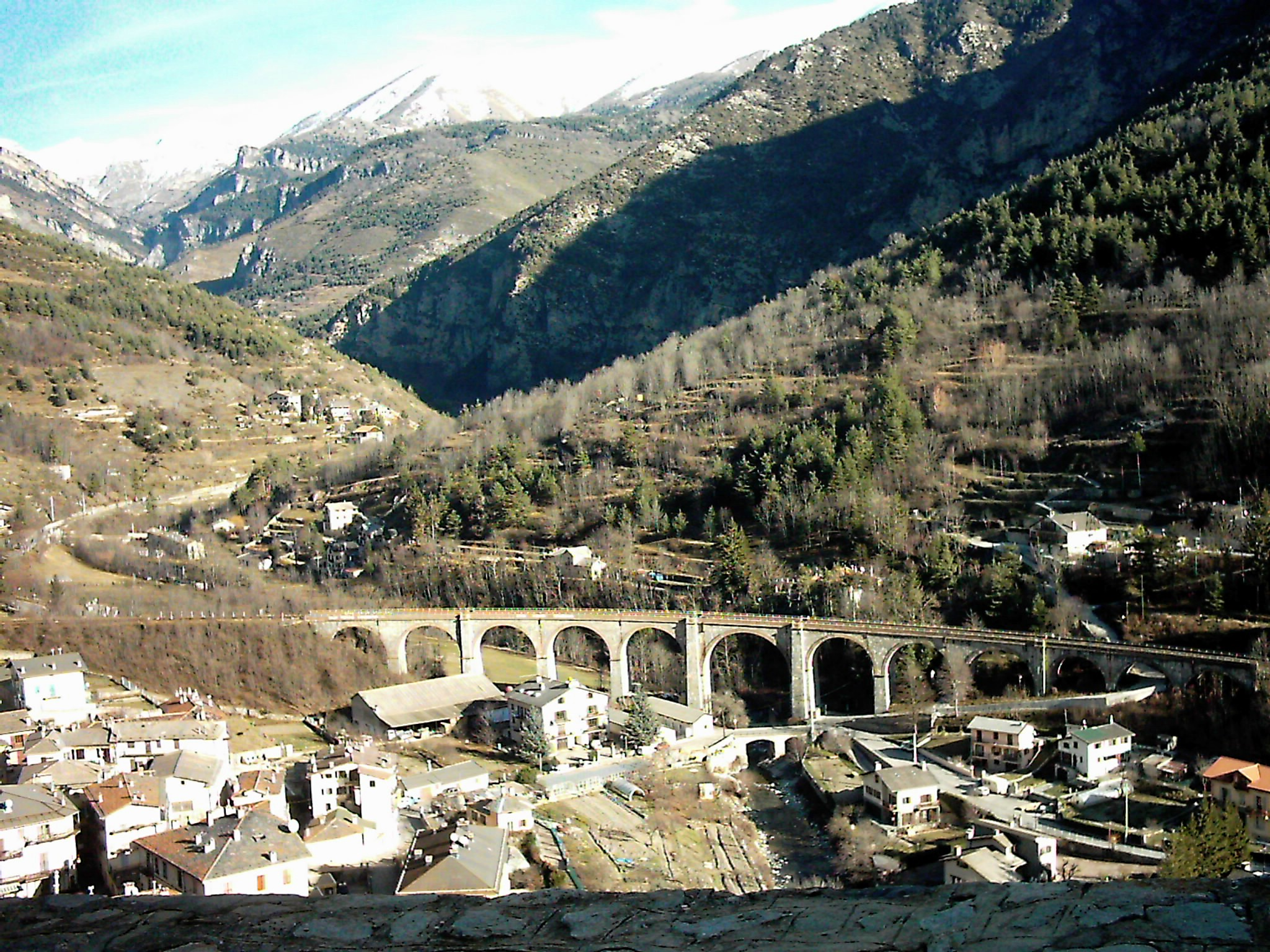
Tenda railway line near the Col de Tende

=== Airports ===
- Cuneo International Airport

=== Motorways ===
The province is crossed by the following motorways (in Italian, autostrade):

- Autostrada A26: Turin - Savona
- Autostrada A33: Asti - Cuneo

=== Railway lines ===
- Tenda railway line

== See also ==
- Piemonte (wine)

== Sources ==
- Bole, David (2011). Innovative policies for Alpine towns: Alpine space small local urban centres innovative pack. Založba ZRC. ISBN 978-961-254-254-2.
- Holst-Warhaft, Gail; Steenhuis, Tammo (28 November 2012). Losing Paradise: The Water Crisis in the Mediterranean. Ashgate Publishing, Ltd. ISBN 978-1-4094-8846-0.
- Hall, Marcus (2005). Earth Repair: A Transatlantic History of Environmental Restoration. University of Virginia Press. ISBN 978-0-8139-2341-3.
- Kresl, Peter Karl; Ietri, Daniele (2010). The Aging Population and the Competitiveness of Cities: Benefits to the Urban Economy. Edward Elgar Publishing. ISBN 978-1-84980-693-0.
