= Canale, Piedmont =

Canale
- Comune
- Comune di Canale
- Location within Italy Location within Piedmont
- Coordinates: 44°48′N 8°0′E
- Country: Italy
- Region: Piedmont
- Province: Province of Cuneo (CN)

Government
  - Mayor: Silvio Beoletto (since 2004)

Area
  - Total: 18.0 km^{2} (6.9 sq mi)
- Elevation: 193 m (633 ft)

Population (Dec. 2004)
  - Total: 5,544
  - Density: 308/km^{2} (798/sq mi)
- Demonym: Canalesi
- Time zone: UTC+1 (CET)
  - Summer (DST): UTC+2 (CEST)
- Postal code: 12043
- Dialing code: 0173
- Website: Official website

Canale is a comune (municipality) in the Province of Cuneo in the Italian region Piedmont, located about 40 kilometres (25 mi) southeast of Turin and about 60 kilometres (37 mi) northeast of Cuneo. As of 31 December 2004, it had a population of 5,544 and an area of 18.0 square kilometres (6.9 mi^{2}).

Canale borders the following municipalities: Castellinaldo, Cisterna d'Asti, Montà, Monteu Roero, Priocca, San Damiano d'Asti, Santo Stefano Roero, and Vezza d'Alba.

== Demographic evolution ==
Historical population

Year	Pop.	±%
1861	4,733	—
1871	4,934	+4.2%
1881	5,309	+7.6%
1901	5,557	+4.7%
1911	5,400	−2.8%

Year	Pop.	±%
1921	5,103	−5.5%
1931	5,052	−1.0%
1936	4,965	−1.7%
1951	4,593	−7.5%
1961	4,409	−4.0%

Year	Pop.	±%
1971	4,733	+7.3%
1981	4,876	+3.0%
1991	4,965	+1.8%
2001	5,215	+5.0%

Source: Data from ISTAT
