= Montà =

- Comune
- Comune di Montà
- Coat of arms

- Location within Italy Location within Piedmont
- Coordinates: 44°49′N 7°57′E
- Country: Italy
- Region: Piedmont
- Province: Cuneo (CN)

Government
  - Mayor: Silvano Valsania

Area
  - Total: 26.7 km^{2} (10.3 sq mi)
- Elevation: 316 m (1,037 ft)

Population (31 May 2007)
  - Total: 4,445
  - Density: 166/km^{2} (431/sq mi)
- Demonym: Montatesi
- Time zone: UTC+1 (CET)
  - Summer (DST): UTC+2 (CEST)
- Postal code: 12046
- Dialing code: 0173
- Website: Official website

Montà is a comune (municipality) in the Province of Cuneo in the Italian region Piedmont, located about 35 kilometres (22 mi) southeast of Turin and about 60 kilometres (37 mi) northeast of Cuneo.

Montà borders the following municipalities: Canale, Cellarengo, Cisterna d'Asti, Ferrere, Pralormo, Santo Stefano Roero, and Valfenera.

== Notable people ==
- Placido Mossello (1835–1894), painter
