= Santo Stefano Roero =

- Comune
- Comune di Santo Stefano Roero
- Location within Italy Location within Piedmont
- Coordinates: 44°47′N 7°56′E
- Country: Italy
- Region: Piedmont
- Province: Province of Cuneo (CN)

Area
  - Total: 13.4 km^{2} (5.2 sq mi)

Population (Dec. 2004)
  - Total: 1,314
  - Density: 98.1/km^{2} (254/sq mi)
- Time zone: UTC+1 (CET)
  - Summer (DST): UTC+2 (CEST)
- Postal code: 12040
- Dialing code: 0173

Santo Stefano Roero is a comune (municipality) in the Province of Cuneo in the Italian region Piedmont, located about 35 kilometres (22 mi) southeast of Turin and about 50 kilometres (31 mi) northeast of Cuneo. As of 31 December 2004, it had a population of 1,314 and an area of 13.4 square kilometres (5.2 mi^{2}).

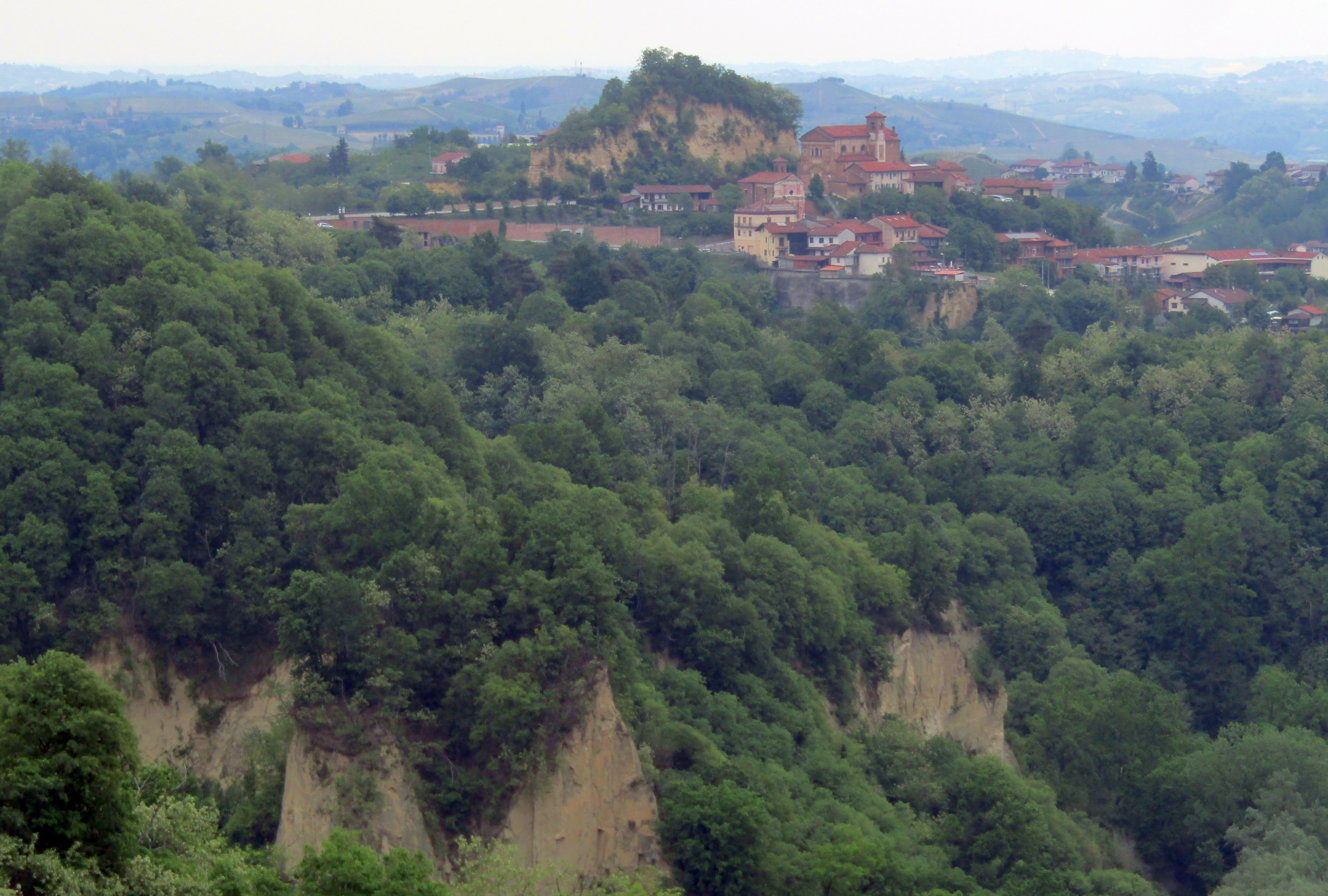
Landscape and city of Santo Stefano Roero

Santo Stefano Roero borders the following municipalities: Canale, Montà, Monteu Roero, and Pralormo.

== Demographic evolution ==
Historical population

Year	Pop.	±%
1861	2,310	—
1871	2,399	+3.9%
1881	2,568	+7.0%
1901	2,477	−3.5%
1911	2,577	+4.0%

Year	Pop.	±%
1921	2,564	−0.5%
1931	2,388	−6.9%
1936	2,223	−6.9%
1951	1,948	−12.4%
1961	1,487	−23.7%

Year	Pop.	±%
1971	1,312	−11.8%
1981	1,136	−13.4%
1991	1,161	+2.2%
2001	1,236	+6.5%

Source: Data from ISTAT
