= Priocca =

- Comune
- Comune di Priocca
- Location within Italy Location within Piedmont
- Coordinates: 44°47′N 8°4′E
- Country: Italy
- Region: Piedmont
- Province: Province of Cuneo (CN)

Area
  - Total: 9.1 km^{2} (3.5 sq mi)

Population (Dec. 2004)
  - Total: 1,979
  - Density: 220/km^{2} (560/sq mi)
- Demonym: Priocchesi
- Time zone: UTC+1 (CET)
  - Summer (DST): UTC+2 (CEST)
- Postal code: 12040
- Dialing code: 0173

Priocca is a comune (municipality) in the Province of Cuneo in the Italian region Piedmont, located about 45 kilometres (28 mi) southeast of Turin and about 60 kilometres (37 mi) northeast of Cuneo. As of 31 December 2004, it had a population of 1,979 and an area of 9.1 square kilometres (3.5 mi^{2}).

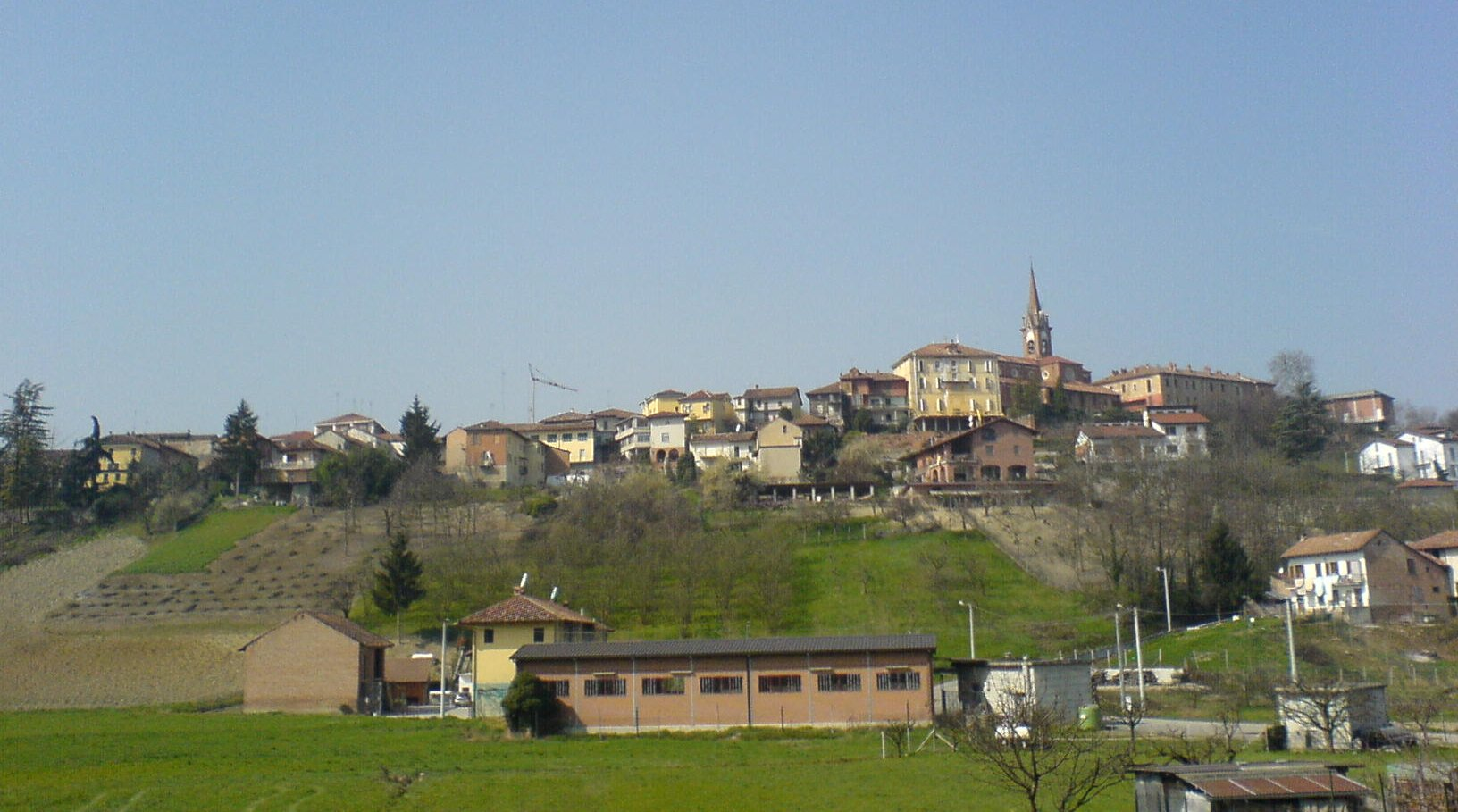
The center of Priocca

Priocca borders the following municipalities: Canale, Castellinaldo, Govone, Magliano Alfieri, and San Damiano d'Asti.

== Demographic evolution ==
Historical population

Year	Pop.	±%
1861	2,241	—
1871	2,383	+6.3%
1881	2,480	+4.1%
1901	2,722	+9.8%
1911	2,730	+0.3%

Year	Pop.	±%
1921	2,787	+2.1%
1931	2,645	−5.1%
1936	2,490	−5.9%
1951	2,279	−8.5%
1961	1,960	−14.0%

Year	Pop.	±%
1971	1,882	−4.0%
1981	1,803	−4.2%
1991	1,784	−1.1%
2001	1,956	+9.6%

Source: Data from ISTAT
