= Cisterna d'Asti =

- Comune
- Comune di Cisterna d'Asti
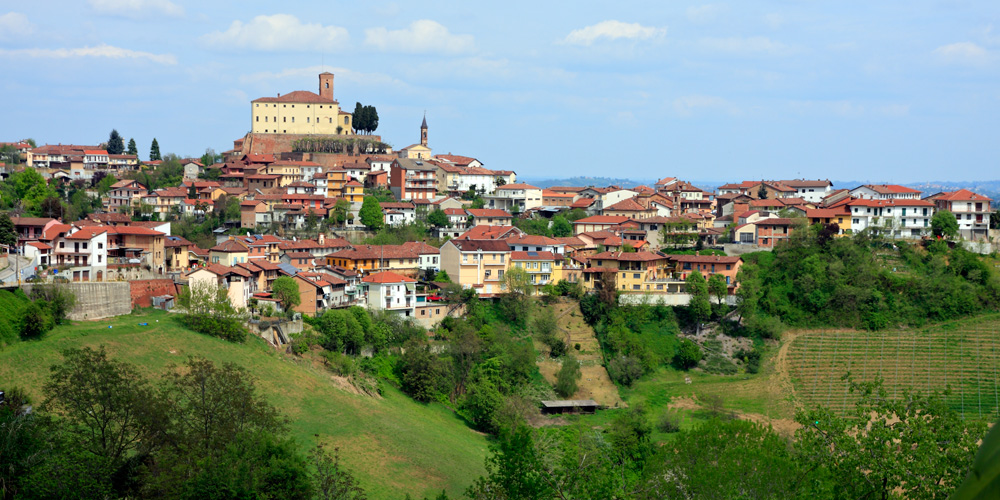
- View of Cisterna d'Asti

- Coat of arms

- Location within Italy Location within Piedmont
- Coordinates: 44°50′N 8°0′E
- Country: Italy
- Region: Piedmont
- Province: Province of Asti (AT)

Area
  - Total: 10.7 km^{2} (4.1 sq mi)

Population (Dec. 2004)
  - Total: 1,257
  - Density: 117/km^{2} (304/sq mi)
- Time zone: UTC+1 (CET)
  - Summer (DST): UTC+2 (CEST)
- Postal code: 14010
- Dialing code: 0141

Cisterna d'Asti is a comune (municipality) in the Province of Asti in the Italian region Piedmont, located about 35 kilometres (22 mi) southeast of Turin and about 15 kilometres (9 mi) southwest of Asti. On 31 December 2004, it had a population of 1,257 and an area of 10.7 square kilometres (4.1 mi^{2}).

Cisterna d'Asti borders the following municipalities: Canale, Ferrere, Montà, and San Damiano d'Asti.

== Demographic evolution ==
Historical population

| Year | Pop. | ±% |
|---|---|---|
| 1861 | 2,042 | — |
| 1871 | 2,131 | +4.4% |
| 1881 | 2,166 | +1.6% |
| 1901 | 2,297 | +6.0% |
| 1911 | 2,523 | +9.8% |

| Year | Pop. | ±% |
|---|---|---|
| 1921 | 2,455 | −2.7% |
| 1931 | 2,333 | −5.0% |
| 1936 | 2,228 | −4.5% |
| 1951 | 1,808 | −18.9% |
| 1961 | 1,326 | −26.7% |

| Year | Pop. | ±% |
|---|---|---|
| 1971 | 1,272 | −4.1% |
| 1981 | 1,245 | −2.1% |
| 1991 | 1,206 | −3.1% |
| 2001 | 1,241 | +2.9% |

Source: Data from ISTAT
