= Sanfrè =

- Comune
- Comune di Sanfrè
- Location within Italy Location within Piedmont
- Coordinates: 44°45′N 7°48′E
- Country: Italy
- Region: Piedmont
- Province: Province of Cuneo (CN)
- Frazioni: Martini, Motta

Area
  - Total: 15.4 km^{2} (5.9 sq mi)

Population (Dec. 2004)
  - Total: 2,602
  - Density: 169/km^{2} (438/sq mi)
- Demonym: Sanfredesi
- Time zone: UTC+1 (CET)
  - Summer (DST): UTC+2 (CEST)
- Postal code: 12040
- Dialing code: 0172

Sanfrè is a comune (municipality) in the Province of Cuneo in the Italian region Piedmont, located about 35 kilometres (22 mi) south of Turin and about 45 kilometres (28 mi) northeast of Cuneo. As of 31 December 2004, it had a population of 2,602 and an area of 15.4 square kilometres (5.9 mi^{2}).

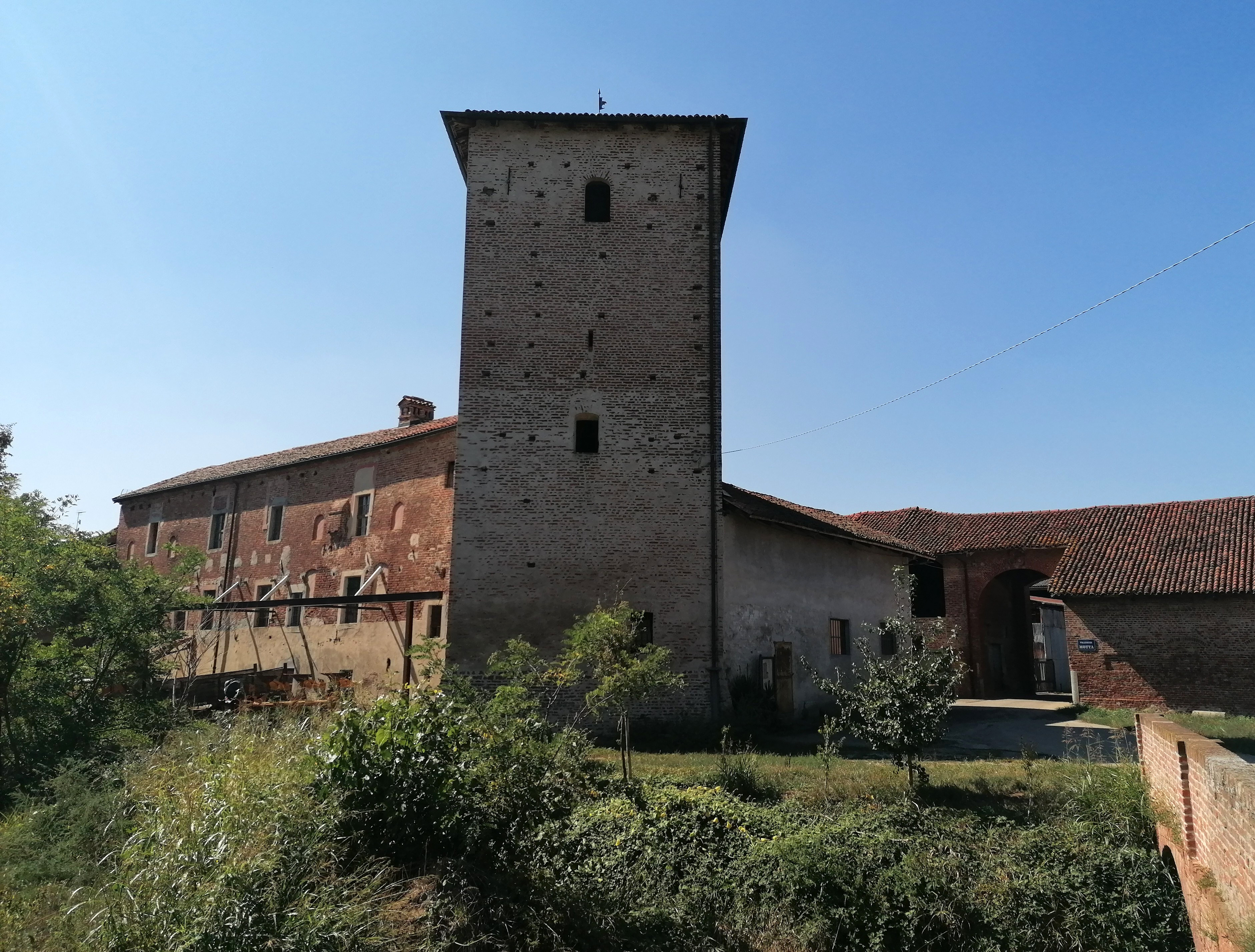
Front view of the Motta degli Isnardi fortification in Sanfrè

The municipality of Sanfrè contains the frazioni (subdivisions, mainly villages and hamlets) Martini and Motta.

Sanfrè borders the following municipalities: Bra, Cavallermaggiore, Pocapaglia, Sommariva del Bosco, and Sommariva Perno.

== Demographic evolution ==
Historical population

Year	Pop.	±%
1861	2,012	—
1871	1,912	−5.0%
1881	1,995	+4.3%
1901	2,015	+1.0%
1911	1,951	−3.2%

Year	Pop.	±%
1921	1,982	+1.6%
1931	2,051	+3.5%
1936	2,020	−1.5%
1951	1,840	−8.9%
1961	1,790	−2.7%

Year	Pop.	±%
1971	1,970	+10.1%
1981	2,000	+1.5%
1991	2,155	+7.7%
2001	2,500	+16.0%

Source: Data from ISTAT
