= Guarene =

- Comune
- Comune di Guarene
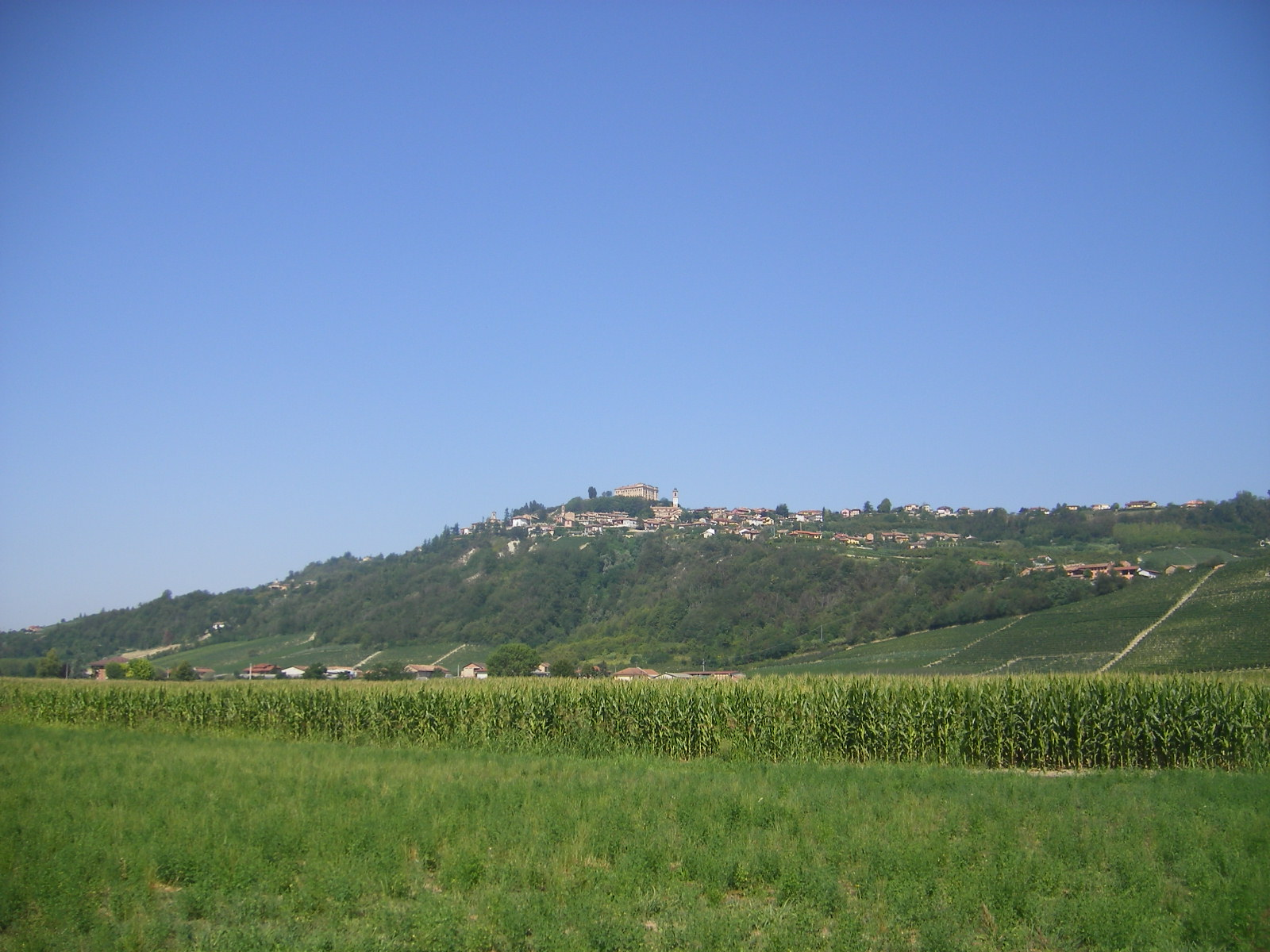

- Coat of arms

- Location within Italy Location within Piedmont
- Coordinates: 44°44′N 8°2′E
- Country: Italy
- Region: Piedmont
- Province: Cuneo (CN)
- Frazioni: Bassi, Biano, Castelrotto, Montebello, Osteria, Racca, Vaccheria

Government
  - Mayor: Franco Artusio

Area
  - Total: 13.4 km^{2} (5.2 sq mi)
- Elevation: 360 m (1,180 ft)

Population (31 May 2007)
  - Total: 3,229
  - Density: 241/km^{2} (624/sq mi)
- Demonym: Guarenesi
- Time zone: UTC+1 (CET)
  - Summer (DST): UTC+2 (CEST)
- Postal code: 12050
- Dialing code: 0173
- Patron saint: Saint James
- Saint day: 25 July
- Website: Official website

Guarene is a comune (municipality) in the Province of Cuneo in the Italian region Piedmont, located in the area of Roero about 45 kilometres (28 mi) southeast of Turin and about 50 kilometres (31 mi) northeast of Cuneo. It is one of I Borghi più belli d'Italia ("The most beautiful villages of Italy").

It is part of the Roero historical region. Main sights include Guarene Castle (rebuilt in the 18th century), with Italian-style gardens, and the 17th century Palazzo Re Rebaudengo, now the seat of exhibitions.

== Agriculture ==
The hilly parts of the commune are planted with vines and fruit trees. The principal grape varieties are Arneis, Nebbiolo, Dolcetto, and Barbera. A wide variety of fruit is grown, but of particular note is the local Madernassa pear, a variety which originated here in 1784 and is currently enjoying an expanding export market, being particularly popular in England. Towards the Tanaro, in Frazione Vaccheria the crops include tomatoes, peppers, garlic, and cardoons.
