= Castagnito =

- Comune
- Comune di Castagnito
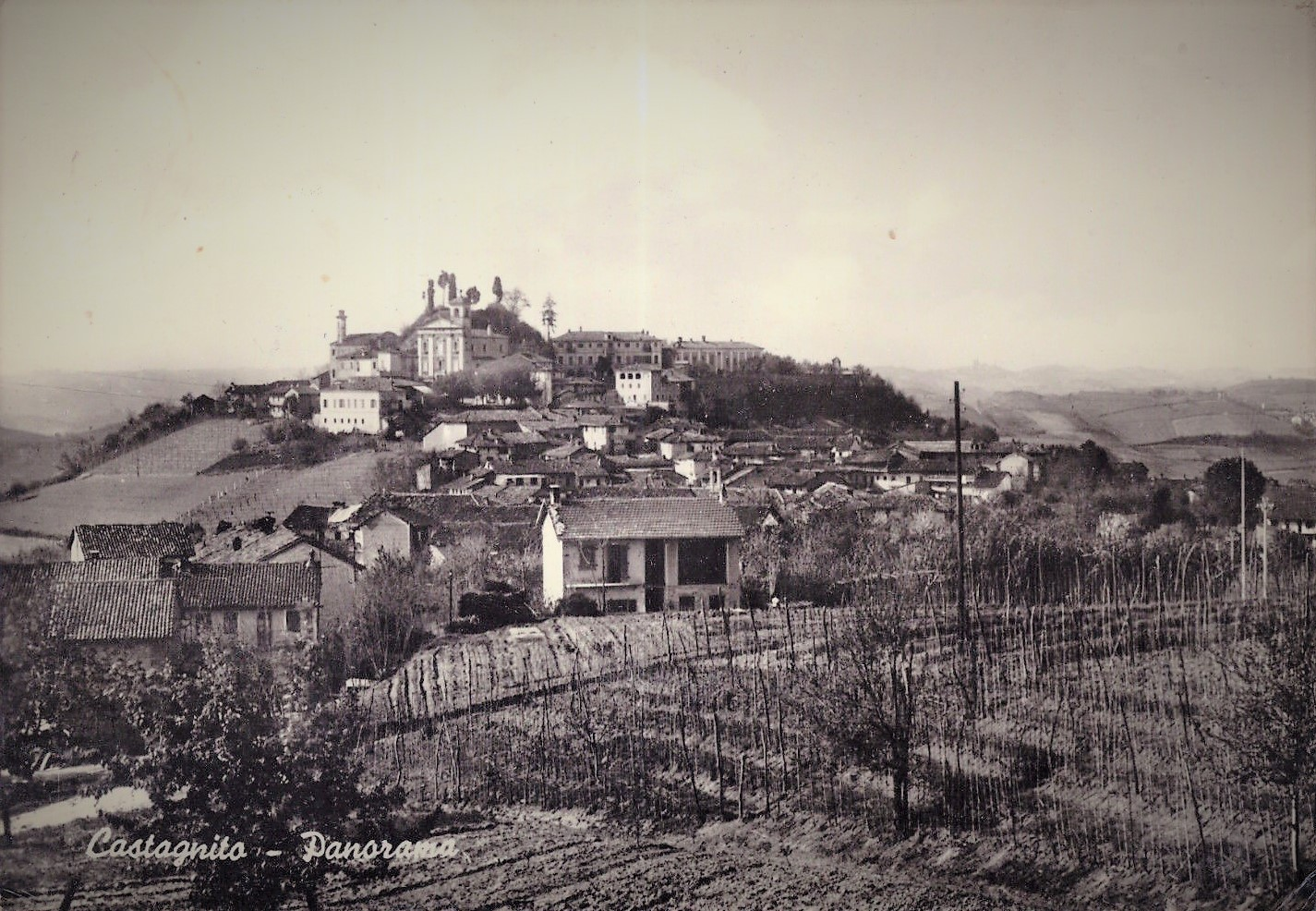

- Coat of arms

- Location within Italy Location within Piedmont
- Coordinates: 44°45′N 8°2′E
- Country: Italy
- Region: Piedmont
- Province: Cuneo (CN)

Government
  - Mayor: Felice Pietro Isnardi

Area
  - Total: 7.1 km^{2} (2.7 sq mi)
- Elevation: 350 m (1,150 ft)

Population (31 May 2007)
  - Total: 2,007
  - Density: 280/km^{2} (730/sq mi)
- Demonym: Castagnitesi
- Time zone: UTC+1 (CET)
  - Summer (DST): UTC+2 (CEST)
- Postal code: 12050
- Dialing code: 0173
- Patron saint: St. John the Baptist
- Saint day: 24 June

Castagnito is a comune (municipality) in the Province of Cuneo in the Italian region Piedmont, located about 45 kilometres (28 mi) southeast of Turin and about 60 kilometres (37 mi) northeast of Cuneo. It is part of the Roero historical region. Maria Teresa Merlo was born here.
