= Vezza d'Alba =

- Comune
- Comune di Vezza d'Alba
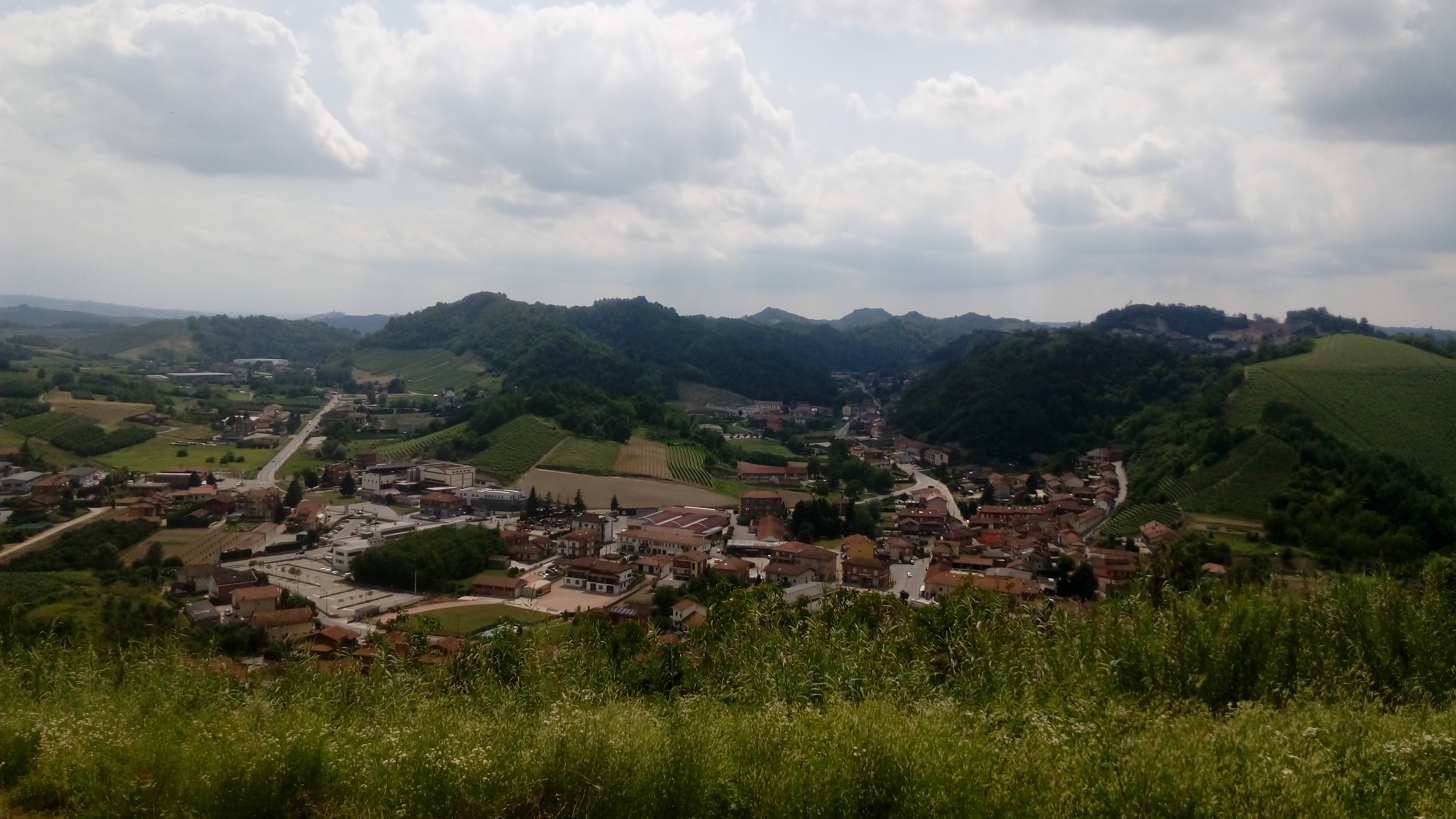

- Coat of arms

- Location within Italy Location within Piedmont
- Coordinates: 44°46′N 08°00′E
- Country: Italy
- Region: Piedmont
- Province: Cuneo (CN)
- Frazioni: Borbore, Borgonuovo, Socco, Madernassa, Riassolo

Area
  - Total: 14 km^{2} (5.4 sq mi)
- Elevation: 313 m (1,027 ft)

Population (2011)
  - Total: 2,261
  - Density: 160/km^{2} (420/sq mi)
- Demonym: Vezzesi
- Time zone: UTC+1 (CET)
  - Summer (DST): UTC+2 (CEST)
- Postal code: 12040
- Dialing code: 0173
- Patron saint: Saint Martin
- Saint day: November 11

Vezza d'Alba is a comune in the Piedmont region of Italy. It is in the province of Cuneo, and is 65 km (40 mi) north east of the town of Cuneo.

Vezza was first recorded in the 10th century, as a territory of the Diocese of Asti and later passed to the Roero family who built the castle at Guarene.

== Twin towns ==
Vezza d'Alba is twinned with:

- Jonquières-Saint-Vincent, France
