= Monticello d'Alba =

- Comune
- Comune di Monticello d'Alba
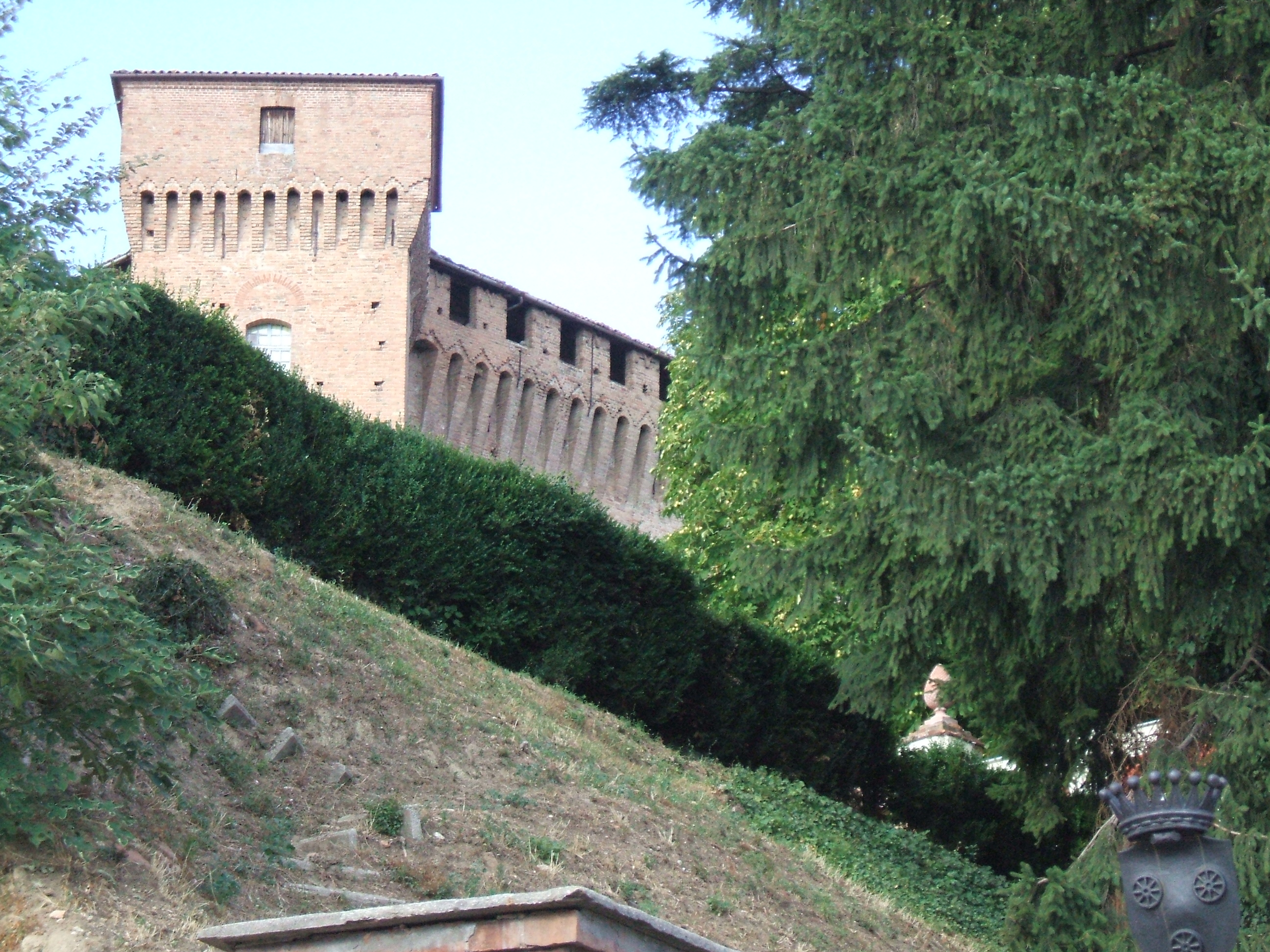
- The castle of Monticello.

- Coat of arms

- Location within Italy Location within Piedmont
- Coordinates: 44°43′N 7°57′E
- Country: Italy
- Region: Piedmont
- Province: Cuneo (CN)

Government
  - Mayor: Monica Settimo

Area
  - Total: 10.1 km^{2} (3.9 sq mi)
- Elevation: 320 m (1,050 ft)

Population (31 May 2007)
  - Total: 2,079
  - Density: 206/km^{2} (533/sq mi)
- Demonym: Monticellesi
- Time zone: UTC+1 (CET)
  - Summer (DST): UTC+2 (CEST)
- Postal code: 12066
- Dialing code: 0173
- Website: Official website

Monticello d'Alba is a comune (municipality) in the Province of Cuneo in the Italian region Piedmont, located on the left bank of the Tanaro river, about 45 kilometres (28 mi) southeast of Turin and about 50 kilometres (31 mi) northeast of Cuneo.

It is home to one of the best preserved castles in Piedmont.

== Population ==
Historical population
Year	Pop.	±%
1981	1,711	—
1991	1,760	+2.9%
2001	1,911	+8.6%
2011	2,216	+16.0%
2021	2,351	+6.1%
2025	2,341	−0.4%

== Twin towns ==
Monticello d'Alba is twinned with:

- Sastre, Santa Fe, Argentina (1988)
