= Occitan Valleys =

Region of Italy

Map of the Occitan Valleys: A. Communes declared to be Occitan-speaking, according to Italian law 482/99 B. Communes declared to be partly Occitan-speaking, according to Italian law 482/99 C. Communes of the valleys not declared to be Occitan-speaking, according to Italian law 482/99 D. Communes declared to be Francoprovençal-speaking, according to Italian law 482/99 ★ E. Communes declared to be French-speaking, according to Italian law 482/99 F. Italian communes of the Marquisate of Dolceacqua and other dependencies of the County of Nice G. Approximative boundary of the Occitan valleys H. Boundary of Occitan language according to IRES of Piedmont, where it differs from G I. Boundary of the Occitan language according to the IEO, where it differs from G J. Northern boundary of the brigasc-royasc area K. Approximative boundary of the Occitan language L. Approximative boundary of Old Occitan M. Eastern boundary of the county of Nice N. Eastern boundary of the department of Alpes-Maritimes (1793-1814) O. Eastern boundary of the province of Nice (1859-1860) P. Eastern boundary of non-diphtongation Q. Eastern boundary of /bew/ vs /biw/

The Occitan Valleys are the part of Occitania (the territory of the Occitan language) within the borders of Italy. It is a mountainous region in the southern Alps. Most of its valleys are oriented eastward and descend toward the plains of Piedmont.

The area has a population of 174,476 inhabitants (July, 2013). Its major towns are Lo Borg Sant Dalmatz (Borgo San Dalmazzo), Buscha (Busca), Boves (Bueves) and Draonier (Dronero).

The Occitan linguistic enclave of La Gàrdia (Guardia Piemontese) in Calabria does not belong to the Occitan Valleys.

A 1999 Italian law ("Law 482") provides for the protection of linguistic minorities, including Occitan.

== Communities with clear Occitan presence before the 482/99 Act ==
These are the villages where an autochthonous Provençal-speaking community has surely settled and may still speak the language. Around 35% of the population (stats by Enrico Allasino, IRES 2005 and IRES Piemonte no.113/2007) declared to be able to speak or understand the local Provençal language, with various levels of proficiency. Italian and Piedmontese are spoken by the majority of the people in the area, and the patois is much influenced by both the other two languages.

Val d'Ors	Upper Susa Valley
Bardonescha	Bardonecchia
Cesana	Cesana Torinese
Chaumont	Chiomonte
Las Clavieras	Claviere
Exilhas	Exilles
Ols or Ors	Oulx
Salbertrand	Salbertrand
Lo Grand Sauze	Sauze di Cesana
Lo Sauze (d'Ors)	Sauze d'Oulx
La Sestriera	Sestriere
Val Cluson	Alta Val Chisone
Finoistrèlas	Fenestrelle
Praamòl	Pramollo
Prajalats	Pragelato
Lo Rore	Roure
Usseaus	Usseaux
Val Sant Martin Val Sopata	Val Germanasca
Pomaret	Pomaretto
Massèl	Massello
Lo Perier	Perrero
Praal	Prali
Salsa	Salza di Pinerolo
Val Pèlis	Val Pellice
Angrònha	Angrogna
Buèbi	Bobbio Pellice
La Tor	Torre Pellice
Lo Vialar	Villar Pellice
Val Pò	Alta Valle Po
Ostana	Ostana
Val Varacha	Val Varaita
Blins	Bellino
Chastèldalfin	Casteldelfino
Fraisse	Frassino
Lo Mèl	Melle
Pont e la Chanal	Pontechianale
Sant Pèire	Sampeyre
Valmala	Valmala
Venascha	Venasca
Val Maira	Val Maira
Acelh	Acceglio
Cartinhan	Cartignano
Chanuelhas	Canosio
Cèlas	Celle di Macra
Elva	Elva
L'Arma	Macra
La Màrmol	Marmora
Prats	Prazzo
San Dumian	San Damiano Macra
Estròp	Stroppo
Val Grana	Valle Grana
Chastèlmanh	Castelmagno
Montrós	Monterosso Grana
Pradievi	Pradleves
Val d'Estura	Valle Stura
Aison	Aisone
L'Argentiera	Argentera
Demont	Demonte
Pèirapuerc	Pietraporzio
La Ròca	Roccasparvera
Sambuc	Sambuco
Vinai	Vinadio
Val Ges	Valle Gesso
Entraigas	Entracque
Roascha	Roaschia
Vaudier	Valdieri
Val Vermenanha	Val Vermenagna
Limon	Limone Piemonte
Robilant	Robilante
Lou Vernant	Vernante

== Communities whose Occitan community is extinct ==
In these communities, apart from Italian, the most widely spoken language is Piedmontese. In the past, in the lower Val Chisone, Waldensian communities were the major part of the population. Chisone, Pellice and Germanasca Valleys were referred as "Waldensian Valleys" and the local Provençal speech was called "Waldesian language", and it was opposed to the language of the Catholic population which was Piedmontese. The Lower Chisone Valley in the 20th century had a rapid industrial growth, and since then the Waldensian was replaced by Piedmontese in the most populous villages. In Oncino and Crissolo the local patois disappeared after a dramatic depopulation.

Val Cluson	Val Chisone
L'Envèrs de Pinascha	Inverso Pinasca
Peirosa	Perosa Argentina
Pinascha	Pinasca
Prustin	Prarostino
San Geman	San Germano Chisone
Lis Vialars	Villar Perosa
Val Po	Valle Po
Criçòl	Crissolo
Oncin	Oncino

== Communities claimed to be Occitan since the 482/99 Act ==
These are the communities which are referred as "Occitan" in the text of the 482/99 Act, and by the agency of linguistic safeguard Chambra d'Oc, even if there was no previous source which supported this appellation. All these villages and towns lack the historical rootedness of the linguistic minority, because no linguist noticed any Occitan presence before the law. In these cases the Provençal translation of the place name doesn't exist, or it's an exonym used by the patoisants of the upper valleys to indicate the lower valley settlements, or it is the transliteration in Occitan orthography of the Piedmontese/Ligurian toponym.

Val Cluson	Alta Val Chisone
Las Pòrtas	Porte
-	Pinerolese
Campilhon e Fenil	Campiglione-Fenile
Cantaloba	Cantalupa
Frussasc	Frossasco
Pinairòl	Pinerolo
Rolet	Roletto
Sant Pière	San Pietro Val Lemina
San Segond	San Secondo di Pinerolo
Val Pèlis	Val Pellice
Bibiana -	Bibiana
Bricairàs -	Bricherasio
Luserna e San Jan	Luserna San Giovanni
Lusernèta	Lusernetta
Val Infernòt e Plana Padana	Valle Infernotto e Pianura Padana
Barge	Barge
Banhòl	Bagnolo Piemonte
Envie	Envie
Revèl	Revello
Val Pò	Valle Po
Brondèl	Brondello
Castelar	Castellar
Gambasca	Gambasca
Martinhana	Martiniana Po
Paisana	Paesana
Panh	Pagno
Rifred	Rifreddo
Sant Frònt	Sanfront
Val Varacha	Val Varaita
Brossasc	Brossasco
Isascha	Isasca
Peasc	Piasco
Rossana	Rossana
Val Maira	Val Maira
Busca	Busca
Draonier	Dronero
La Ròca	Roccabruna
Lo Vilar	Villar San Costanzo
Val Grana	Valle Grana
Bernès	Bernezzo
Caralh	Caraglio
Cervasca	Cervasca
Montomal	Montemale di Cuneo
Valgrana	Valgrana
Val d'Estura	Valle Stura
Lo Borg	Borgo San Dalmazzo
Gaiòla	Gaiola
Moiòla	Moiola
Ritana	Rittana
Valàuria	Valloriate
Vinhòl	Vignolo
Val Ges	Valle Gesso
Rocavion	Roccavione
Region de Mondòvi	Mondovì neighbourhood
Frabosa Sobrana	Frabosa Soprana
Frabosa Sotana	Frabosa Sottana
Roburent	Roburent
Ròcafòrt	Roccaforte Mondovì
Vilanòva	Villanova Mondovì
Val Pes	Valle Pesio
Bueves -	Boves
La Clusa -	Chiusa di Pesio
Poranh	Peveragno
Tèrra Brigasca	Upper Tanaro Valley
Ra Briga Auta	Briga Alta
Viosèna	Viozene di Ormea
Reaud	Realdo di Triora
Verdeja	Verdeggia di Triora
Val Ròia	Roja Valley
Auriveta	Olivetta San Michele

== See also ==
- Baìo
- Occitan folk music
- John Charles Beckwith
- Luserna San Giovanni
- Val Pellice
