= Valle Grana =

Valley in Italy

Grana Valley
- Valle Grana
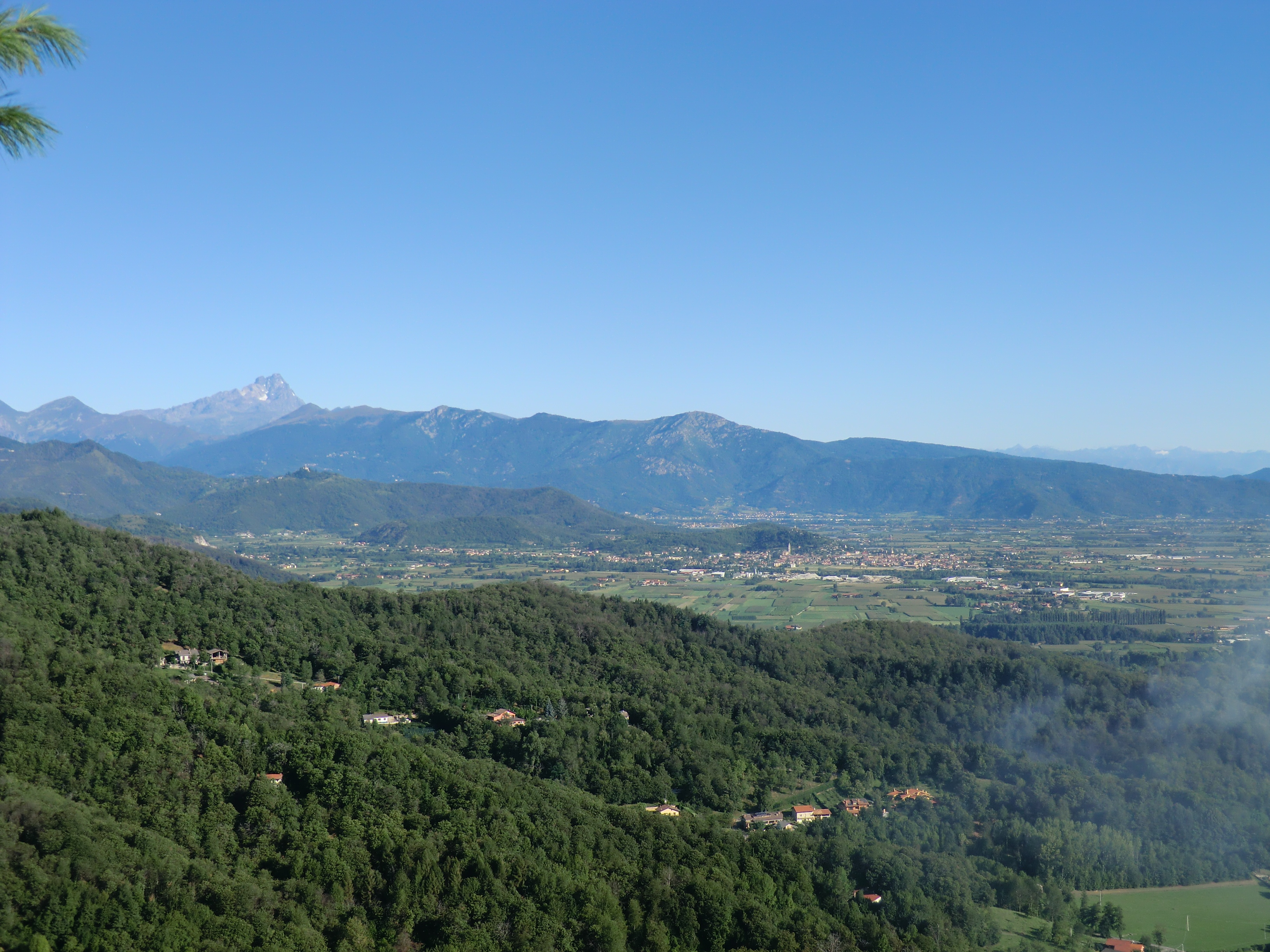
- The lowest part of the valley

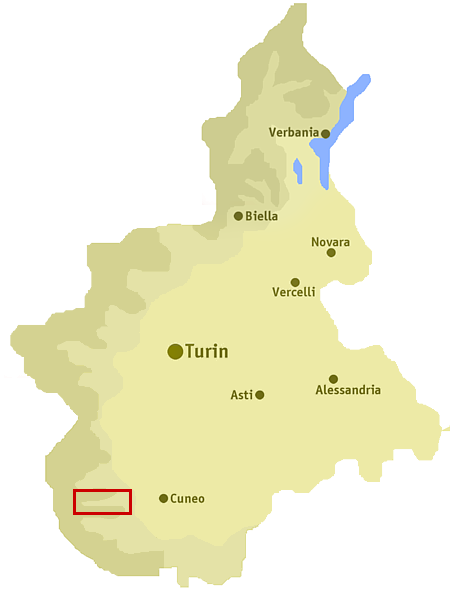
- Location of the valley in Piedmont, NW Italy
- Floor elevation: 600–2,647 m (1,969–8,684 ft)
- Length: around 25 km (16 mi) west east

Geology
- Type: River valley

Geography
- Location: Province of Cuneo, Piedmont, Italy
- Coordinates: 44°24′36″N 7°18′00″E

The Valle Grana is a valley in the province of Cuneo, Piedmont, northern Italy.

== Etymology ==
The valley takes its name from the Grana stream, a left-hand tributary of the Maira which flows through the valley.

== Geography ==
It is located between the Val Maira from the north and the Valle Stura di Demonte on the south. Starting from Caraglio, in the plain, it has a length of 24 km until the Colle Fauniera (also known as Colle dei Morti), at 2,511 m.

Other comuni in the valley include Valgrana, Monterosso Grana, Pradleves and Castelmagno. In the latter's territory is the Sanctuary of San Magno, a notable religious building at 1,761 m of altitude. The highest peak is the Monte Tibert (2,647 m).

== Economy ==
Valle Grana is the birthplace of renowned Castelmagno cheese, which is produced in the comuni of Castelmagno, Pradleves and Monterosso Grana. Historical records from the 12th century document cheese production in Valle Grana. The tradition of making Castelmagno over the summer is still maintained today, as it favoured natural development of blue moulds, due to cool and humid climate conditions during the season at high-altitude.

== See also ==
- Cottian Alps
- Castelmagno cheese
- Valgrana
- Monterosso Grana
- Castelmagno
