= Castelmagno =

Castelmagno may refer to:

- Castelmagno, Piedmont
- Castelmagno cheese
