= Syrianarpia faunieralis =

Scientific classification
- Kingdom: Animalia
- Phylum: Arthropoda
- Clade: Pancrustacea
- Class: Insecta
- Order: Lepidoptera
- Family: Crambidae
- Genus: Syrianarpia
- Species: S. faunieralis

Binomial name
- Syrianarpia faunieralis Gianti, 2005

Species of moth

Syrianarpia faunieralis is a species of moth in the family Crambidae described by Mauro Gianti in 2005. It is found in the Cottian Alps in Italy.

The wingspan is 31–33 mm.

== Etymology ==
The species is named for the type location: Cima Fauniera, a mountain in the Grana Valley.
