= Castelmagno cheese =

Italian cheese

Castelmagno (DOP)
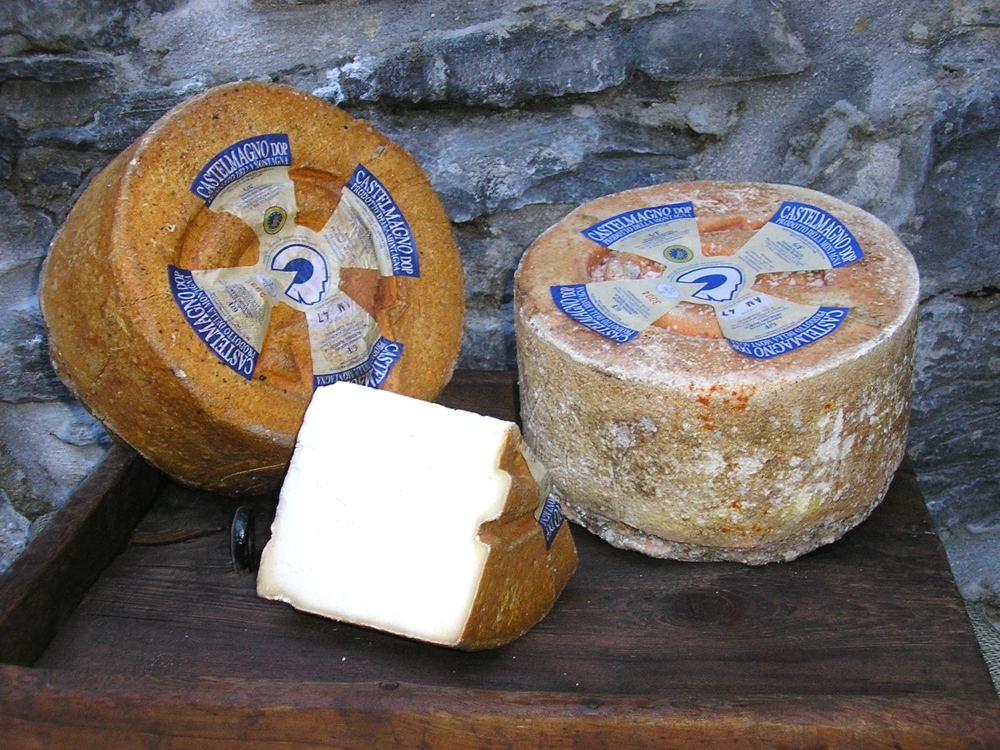
- Country of origin: Italy
- Region, town: Province of Cuneo, Piedmont
- Source of milk: Cows, ewes, goats
- Pasteurised: No
- Texture: Semi-hard
- Aging time: 60 days
- Certification: EU: PDO: 1996: Reg. CE n.1263/96 (OJEU L. 163/96 of 02.07.1996)
- Named after: Castelmagno

Castelmagno (DOP) is an Italian cheese originating from the Piedmont region. It has a protected designation of origin status in the European Union.

== Historical notes ==
Castelmagno is a cheese which has been made for many centuries: the earliest known mention of it dates to 1277, when there is a record that Castelmagno was given as payment to the Marquis of Saluzzo in exchange for use of pasture lands in Castelmagno and Celle di Macra.

== Zone of production ==
The cheese has traditionally been made in the Valle Grana, in the southwest of the province of Cuneo, where production is permitted today within the boundaries of the comuni (municipalities) of Castelmagno, Pradleves and Monterosso Grana.

== Process of production ==
Castelmagno is a semi-hard, half-fat cheese produced from whole cow's milk, obtained from cattle of the Piedmontese breed, fed on fresh forage or hay from mixed meadows or pasture. On occasion, some milk from sheep or goats may be added to the cows' milk.

== Uses ==
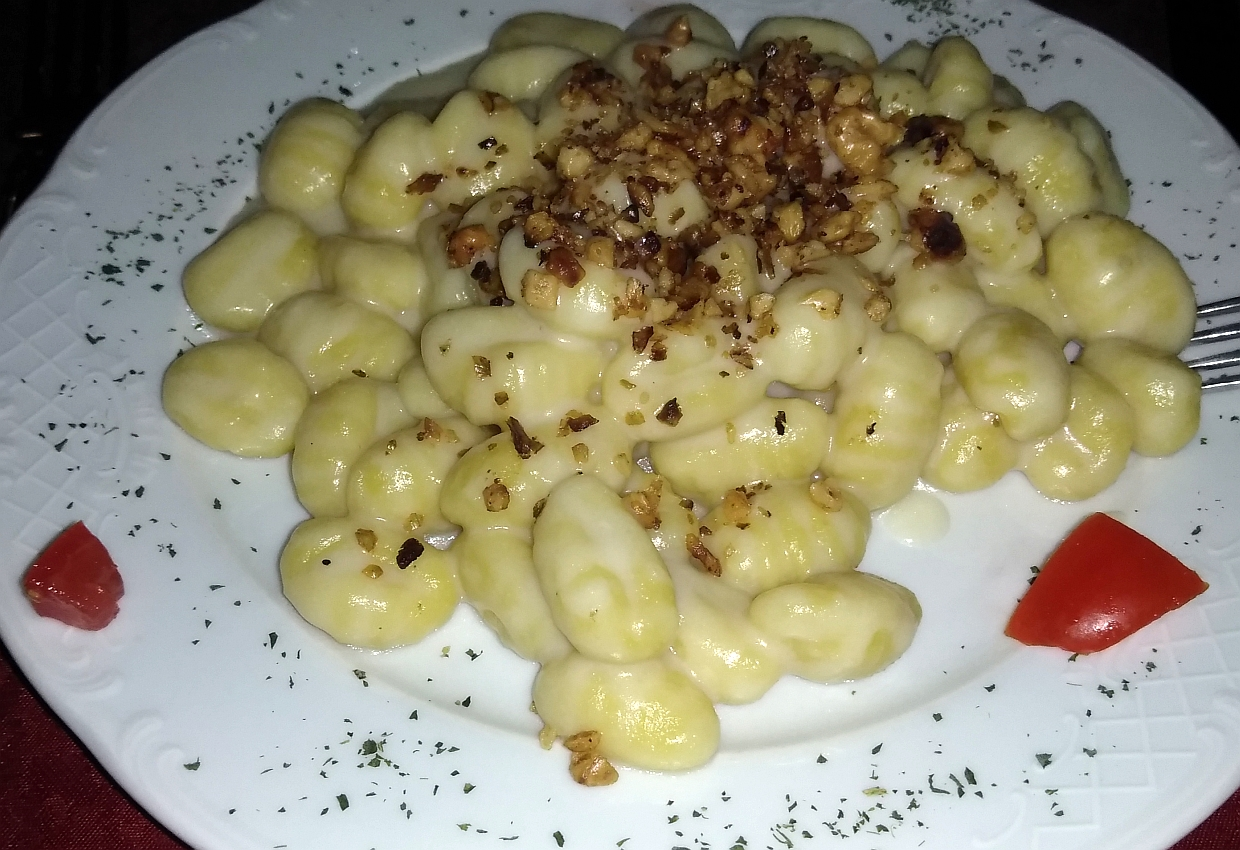
Gnocchi with Castelmagno cheese and crumbed and toasted hazelnuts

Aside from being eaten on its own, Castelmagno can be part of countless recipes, such as in fondue or veloutés and can be eaten along with rice, pasta, polenta, thinly sliced raw beef (carpaccio) or grilled vegetables.

== See also ==
- Medieval cuisine
- List of Italian cheeses
