= Castellar, Piedmont =

Castellar
- Frazione
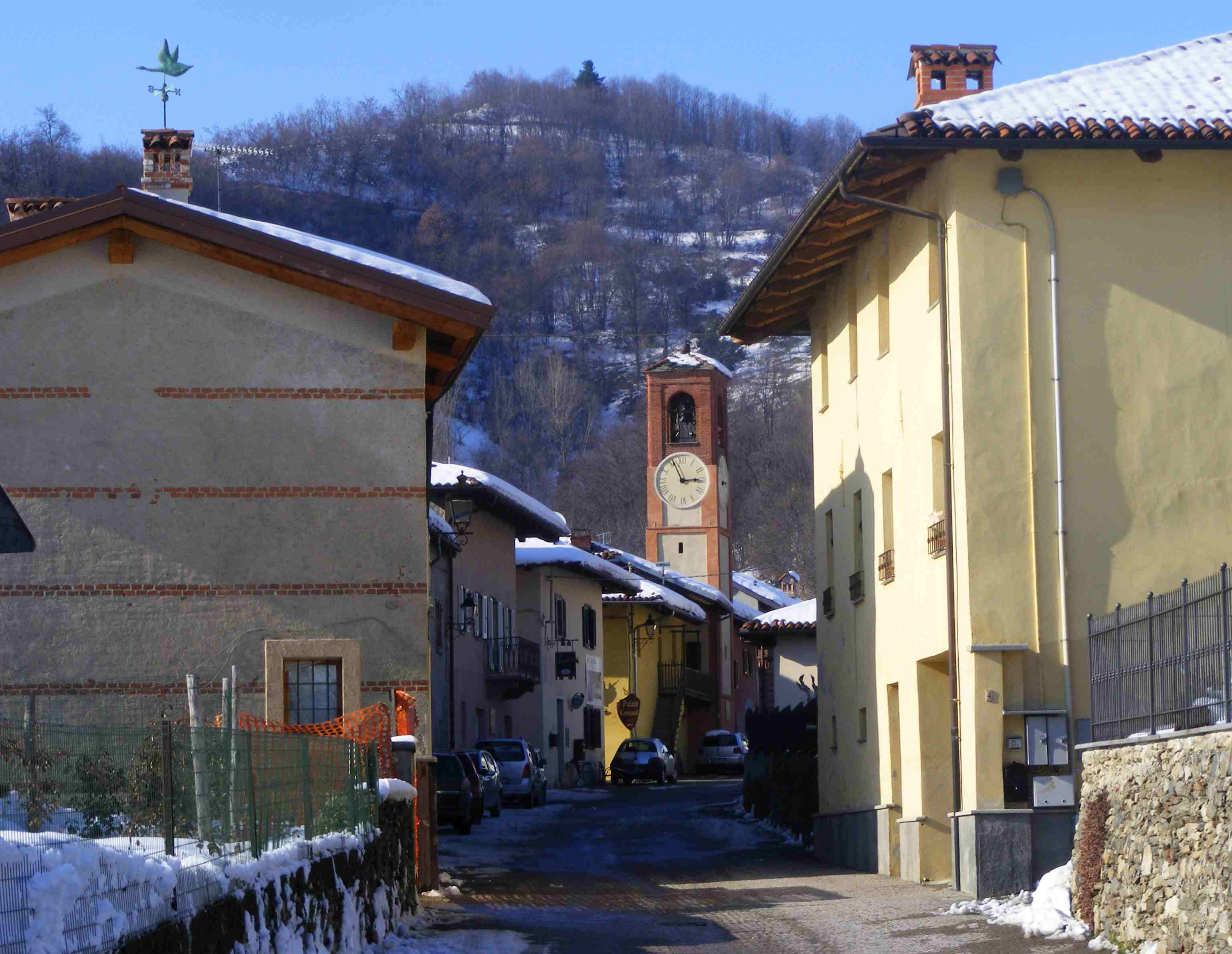
- The centre of Castellar

- Location of Castellar in Italy
- Coordinates: 44°37′N 7°26′E
- Country: Italy
- Region: Piedmont
- Province: Cuneo (CN)
- Comune: Saluzzo

Population (Dec. 2004)
  - Total: 253
- Time zone: UTC+1 (CET)
  - Summer (DST): UTC+2 (CEST)
- Postal code: 12037
- Dialing code: 0175

Castellar was a comune (municipality) in the Province of Cuneo in the Italian region Piedmont, located about 50 kilometres (31 mi) southwest of Turin and about 30 kilometres (19 mi) northwest of Cuneo. As of 31 December 2004, it had a population of 253 and an area of 3.8 square kilometres (1.5 mi^{2}).

== History ==
Castellar was an autonomous comune up to the end of 2018; on 1 January 2019 it was united to the neighbouring comune of Saluzzo, thus enforcing the results of a referendum held in the summer of 2018.

The comune of Castellar bordered the following municipalities: Pagno, Revello, and Saluzzo. It had the following frazioni: Regione Giardino, Regione Morra, Regione Pairunella, Regione San Guglielmo, Regione Testa Nera

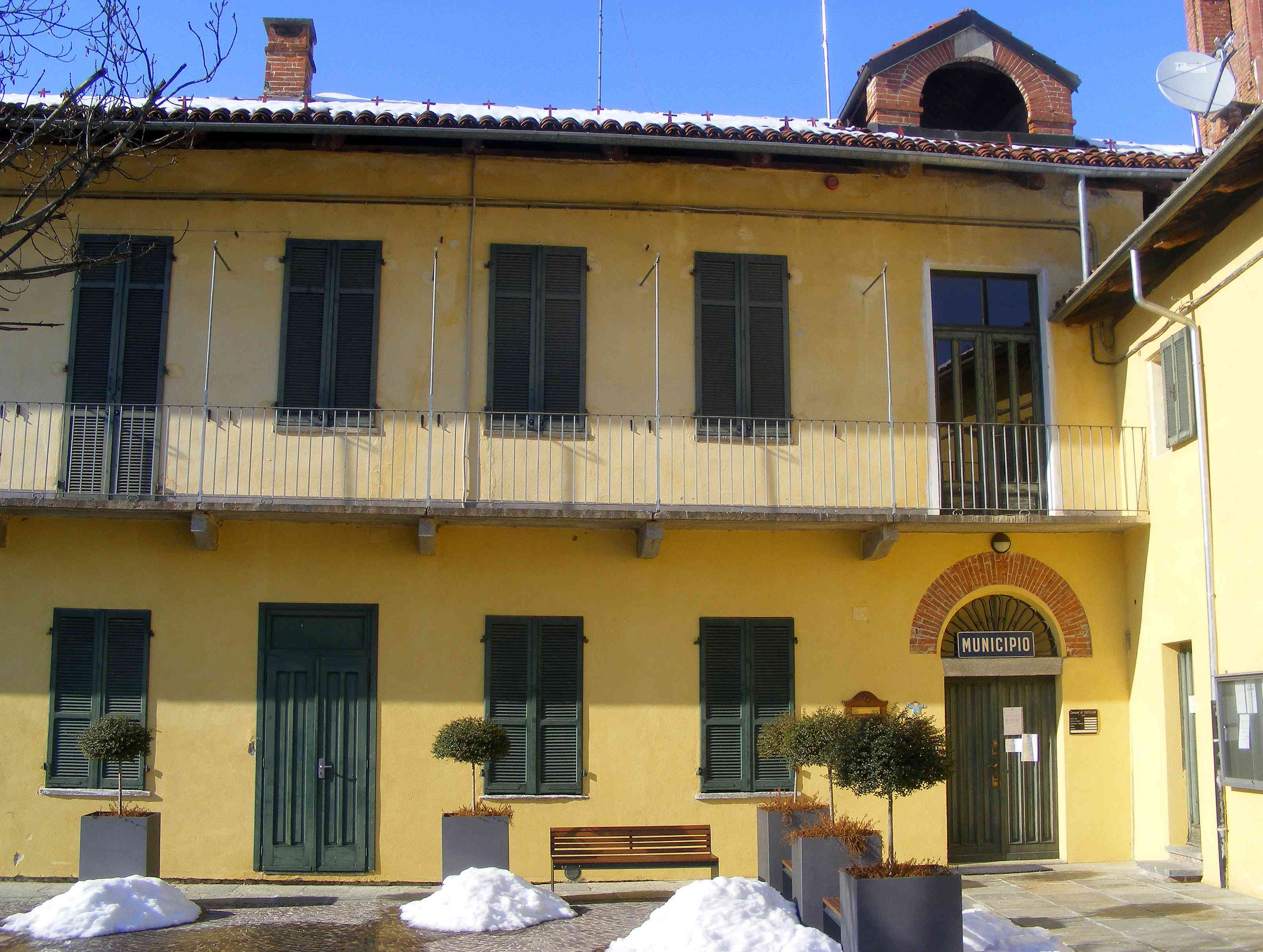
Castellar former town hall

Coat of Arms of the former Comune

== Demographic evolution ==
Historical population

Year	Pop.	±%
1861	399	—
1871	422	+5.8%
1881	408	−3.3%
1901	316	−22.5%
1911	295	−6.6%

Year	Pop.	±%
1921	325	+10.2%
1931	306	−5.8%
1936	300	−2.0%
1951	274	−8.7%
1961	218	−20.4%

Year	Pop.	±%
1971	195	−10.6%
1981	236	+21.0%
1991	241	+2.1%
2001	247	+2.5%

Source: Data from ISTAT
