= Silk Museum =

Silk Museum can refer to any of the following:

- Bsous Silk Museum, Lebanon
- China National Silk Museum, Zhejiang province, China
- The Silk Museum, Macclesfield, Cheshire, England
- Yokohama Silk Museum
- Museum of Calabrian textile, silk, costume and fashion handicrafts
- Suzhou Silk Museum

== See also ==
- Derby Silk Mill
- Maritime Silk Route Museum
- Silk Mill of Caraglio
- Silk Route Museum
