= Syrianarpia =

Scientific classification
- Domain: Eukaryota
- Kingdom: Animalia
- Phylum: Arthropoda
- Class: Insecta
- Order: Lepidoptera
- Family: Crambidae
- Subfamily: Scopariinae
- Genus: Syrianarpia; Leraut, 1982

Genus of moths

Syrianarpia is a genus of moths of the family Crambidae.

== Species ==
- Syrianarpia faunieralis Gianti, 2005
- Syrianarpia kasyi Leraut, 1984
- Syrianarpia mendicalis (Staudinger, 1879)
