= Colle Fauniera =

Mountain pass in Italy

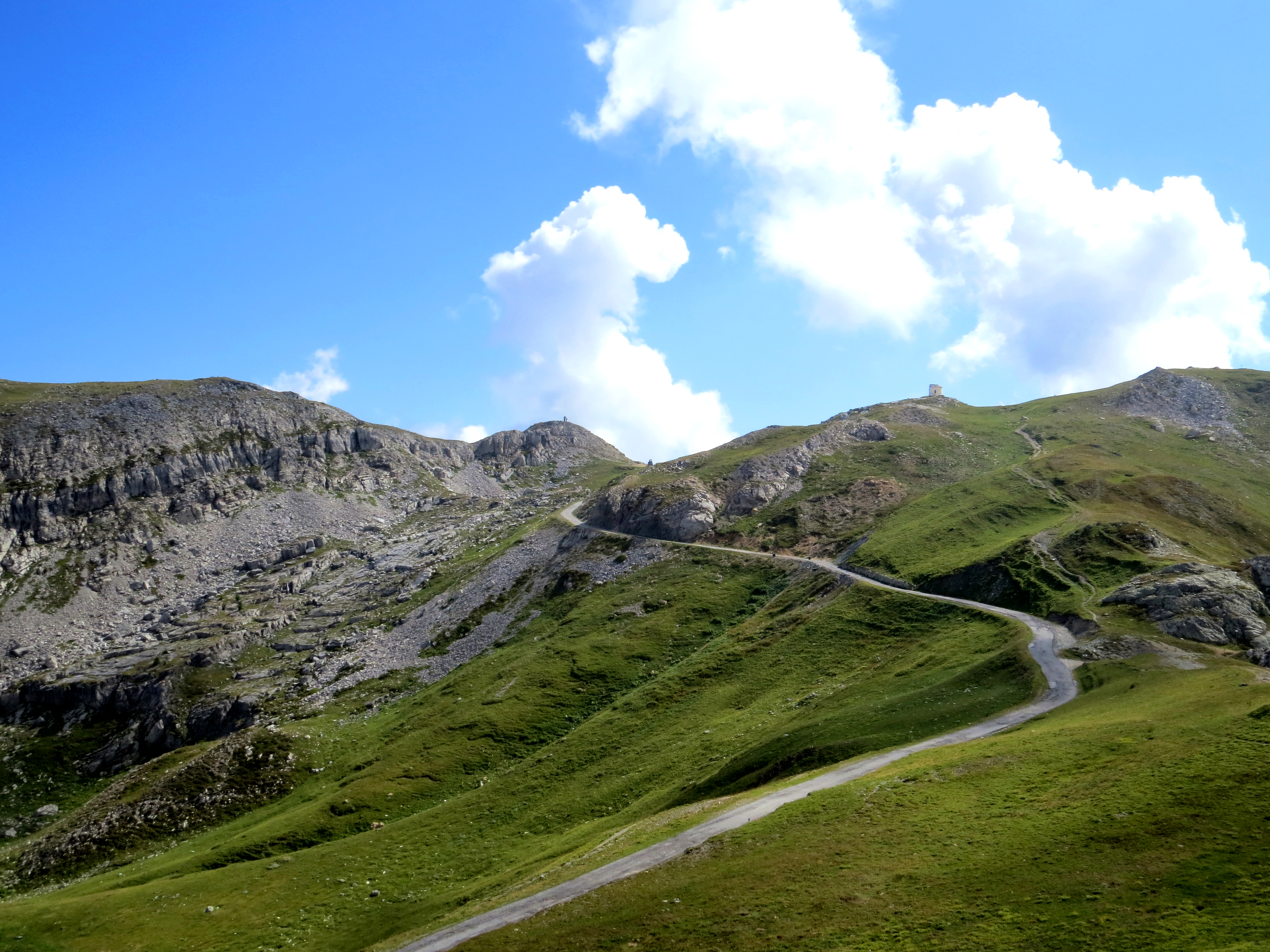

- Location within Italy
- Elevation: 2,481 m (8,140 ft)
- Traversed by: Road

Location
- Location: Piedmont, Italy
- Range: Alps
- Coordinates: 44°23′9″N 7°7′18″E

The Colle Fauniera is a mountain pass in the Cottian Alps, Piedmont, northern Italy, located at 2,481 m elevation.

It is part of the communal territory of Castelmagno and Demonte.

It connects the Valle Grana, which ends here, with the Vallone dell'Arma (a lateral of the Valle Stura di Demonte). The name Colle dei Morti stems from fierce fighting which occurred nearby during the 18th century between Franco-Spanish and Piedmontese troops.

== See also ==
- List of highest paved roads in Europe
- List of mountain passes
