= Rino Rossi =

Italian national and judge

Rino Rossi was born in Chiavenna on 14 August 1889 and was an Italian national. He became Pretore (magistrate) in Caraglio in 1920, and for Turin in 1924. In 1928 he was appointed as President of the District Court of Rhodes, and then in 1934 he was appointed to the District Court in Rome. He was a judge at the Consular Court in Cairo in 1936, then seconded to the Ministry for Foreign Affairs in 1940. In 1941 he returned to Rhodes as President of the Court of Appeal. Here, he took part to the deportation of the entire local Jewish community in July 1944 and was the head of the committees for the alienation of Jewish property. After his return to Italy he had no consequences for his collaboration with the Germans and became Judge at the Court of Appeal, Aquila, and then at the Court of Appeal, Rome in 1945. Following the war, in 1948 he undertook another secondment, this time to the Public Prosecutor's Office at the Court of Cassation. After this, he progressed to become the Deputy Public Prosecutor at the Court of Cassation in 1951, and then the President of Chamber of the Court of Cassation in 1958. He finished his career as Judge at the European Court of Justice, holding his position there from 7 October 1958 to 7 October 1964. He died suddenly on 6 February 1974 in Rome at the age of 84.

== See also ==
- List of members of the European Court of Justice
