= Venasca =

- Comune
- Comune di Venasca
- Location within Italy Location within Piedmont
- Coordinates: 44°34′N 7°24′E
- Country: Italy
- Region: Piedmont
- Province: Province of Cuneo (CN)
- Frazioni: Bonelli, Bricco, Collino, Miceli, Peralba, Rolfa

Area
  - Total: 20.4 km^{2} (7.9 sq mi)
- Elevation: 550 m (1,800 ft)

Population (Dec. 2004)
  - Total: 1,563
  - Density: 76.6/km^{2} (198/sq mi)
- Demonym: Venaschesi
- Time zone: UTC+1 (CET)
  - Summer (DST): UTC+2 (CEST)
- Postal code: 12020
- Dialing code: 0175

Venasca is a comune (municipality) in the Province of Cuneo in the Italian region Piedmont, located about 60 kilometres (37 mi) southwest of Turin and about 25 kilometres (16 mi) northwest of Cuneo. As of 31 December 2004, it had a population of 1,563 and an area of 20.4 square kilometres (7.9 mi^{2}).

The municipality of Venasca contains the frazioni (subdivisions, mainly villages and hamlets) Bonelli, Bricco, Collino, Miceli, Peralba, and Rolfa.

Venasca borders the following municipalities: Brondello, Brossasco, Isasca, Pagno, Piasco, Rossana and Busca.

== Demographic evolution ==
Historical population

Year	Pop.	±%
1861	2,787	—
1871	2,830	+1.5%
1881	3,065	+8.3%
1901	3,405	+11.1%
1911	3,139	−7.8%

Year	Pop.	±%
1921	2,468	−21.4%
1931	2,188	−11.3%
1936	2,219	+1.4%
1951	2,072	−6.6%
1961	1,925	−7.1%

Year	Pop.	±%
1971	1,734	−9.9%
1981	1,592	−8.2%
1991	1,538	−3.4%
2001	1,512	−1.7%

Source: Data from ISTAT
