= Occitan folk music =

Traditional Occitan genre of music

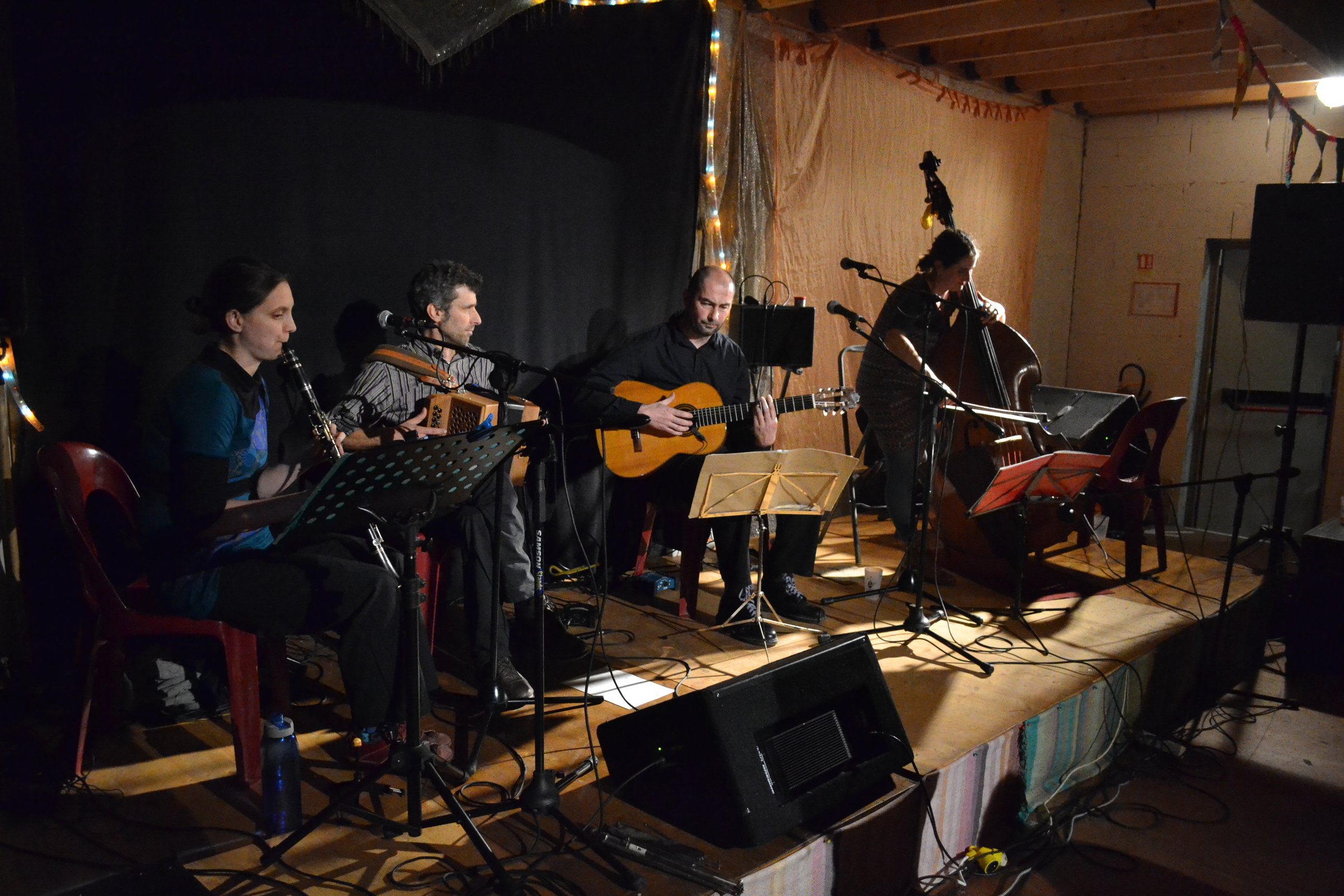
The image features artists playing various instruments related to the folk-genre: guitars, violins, and drums.

The traditional Occitan music in the Occitan Valleys of Italy, along with the language and religion are a fundamental element of aggregation for the local community. They mostly consist of ballads, mainly in the Occitan territories of Piedmont; performed during almost all occasions of celebration in the valleys and are well known even outside the boundaries of Occitan Valleys of Italy.

The ruggedness and impervious nature of the valleys has resulted in each valley having kept its own melodies and dances, different steps and patterns from those of adjacent valleys.

A few of the instruments traditionally used are the accordion, clarinet, violin, organ, as well as the hurdy-gurdy (vioulo), the diatonic button accordion (semitoun) with pinfre (various wind instruments) and the harmonica (ourganin).

== Ballads in the valleys ==
Valle Vermenagna: Courenta, Courenta dei coscritti e Balet Valle Maira: Courento dla Rocho Val Varaita: Countradonsa, Courento, Buréo vièio, Gigo, Tresso, Courente de Coustiole, Grondo Gigo, Moulinet, Guiouno and Cadrio Po Valley: Giga and Bouréa Val Germanasca and Val Chisone: Courento, Ëspouzino, Bouréo de Ruclarét

== Discography ==
1998 Silvio Peron and Gabriele Ferrero Dance of Occitan valleys of Italy - Robi Droli

== See also ==
- Occitania
- Baìo
- French folk music
- Italian folk music
