= Syrianarpia kasyi =

Scientific classification
- Domain: Eukaryota
- Kingdom: Animalia
- Phylum: Arthropoda
- Class: Insecta
- Order: Lepidoptera
- Family: Crambidae
- Genus: Syrianarpia
- Species: S. kasyi

Binomial name
- Syrianarpia kasyi Leraut, 1984

Species of moth

Syrianarpia kasyi is a species of moth in the family Crambidae described by Patrice J.A. Leraut in 1984. It is found in Iran.
