= Reillanne =

- Commune
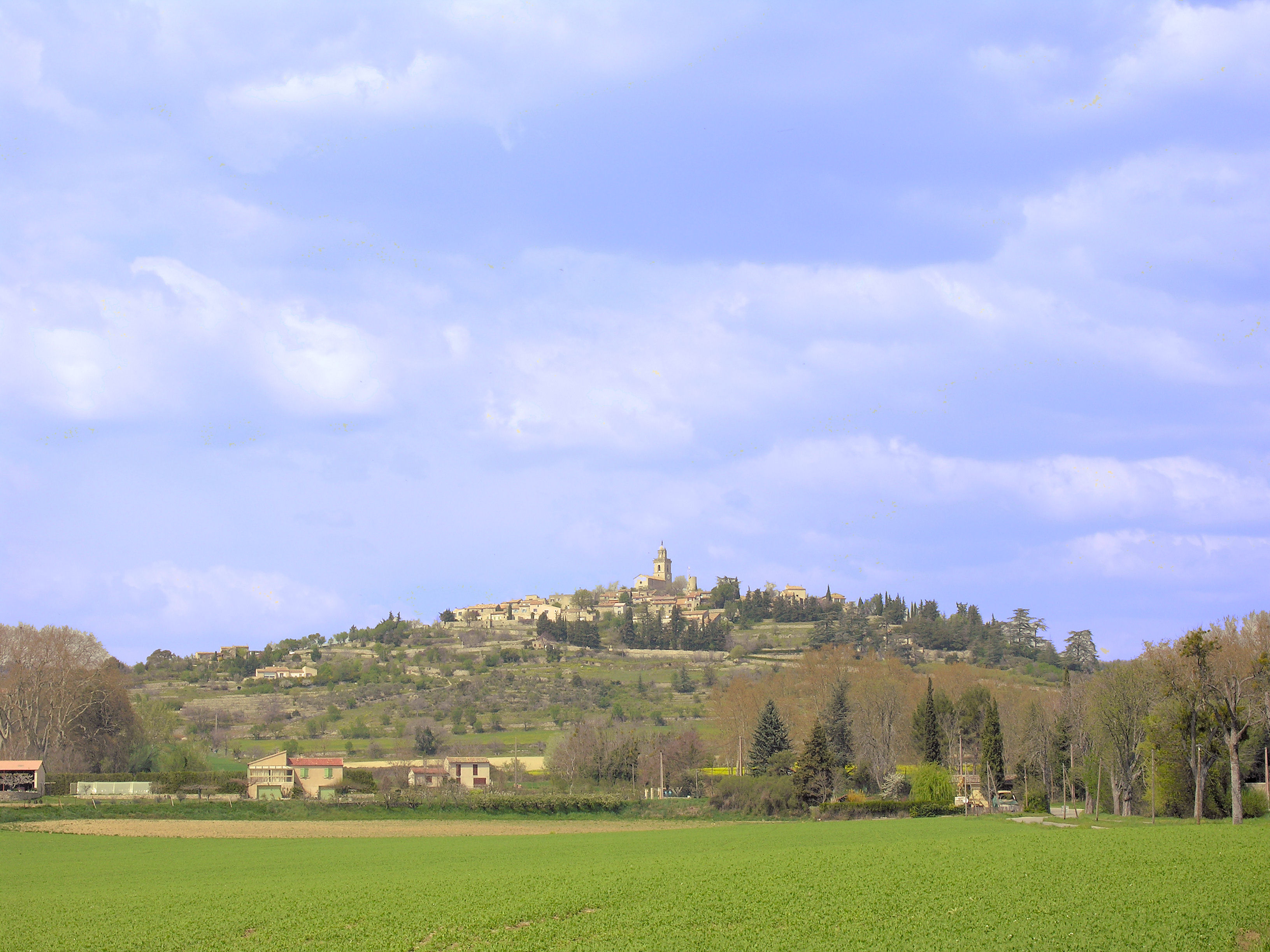
- A general view of the village of Reillanne

- Coat of arms
- Location of Reillanne
- Location within France Location within Provence-Alpes-Côte d'Azur
- Coordinates: 43°53′N 5°40′E
- Country: France
- Region: Provence-Alpes-Côte d'Azur
- Department: Alpes-de-Haute-Provence
- Arrondissement: Forcalquier
- Canton: Reillanne

Government
  - Mayor (2026–32): Sébastien Terranova
- Area^{1}: 38.55 km^{2} (14.88 sq mi)
- Elevation: 600 m (2,000 ft)
- Highest elevation: 805 m (2,641 ft)
- Lowest elevation: 387 m (1,270 ft)
- Population (2023): 1,730
  - Density: 44.9/km^{2} (116/sq mi)
- Time zone: UTC+01:00 (CET)
  - Summer (DST): UTC+02:00 (CEST)
- INSEE/Postal code: 04160 /04110
- ^{1} French Land Register data, which excludes lakes, ponds, glaciers > 1 km^{2} (0.386 sq mi or 247 acres) and river estuaries.

Reillanne (French pronunciation: [ʁɛjan]; Occitan: Ralhana) is a commune in the Alpes-de-Haute-Provence department in southeastern France.

It is due north of Toulon and west of Nice.

== History ==
The earliest record of a city on this site is the Roman town of Alaunia in 909. That city was at the bottom of the hill, but was destroyed by invading barbarians in the 10th century. The residents moved the city to the top of the hill and built a castle for defense. The castle was destroyed during the Wars of Religion but the city itself survived.

== Population ==
Historical population
Year	Pop.	±% p.a.
1968	602	—
1975	665	+1.43%
1982	892	+4.28%
1990	1,197	+3.74%
1999	1,322	+1.11%
2007	1,478	+1.40%
2012	1,552	+0.98%
2017	1,675	+1.54%
2023	1,730	+0.54%
Source: INSEE

== Twin towns ==
Reillanne is twinned with:

- Roccasparvera, Italy (1996)

== See also ==
- Luberon
- Communes of the Alpes-de-Haute-Provence department
