= Baìo =

Italian festival

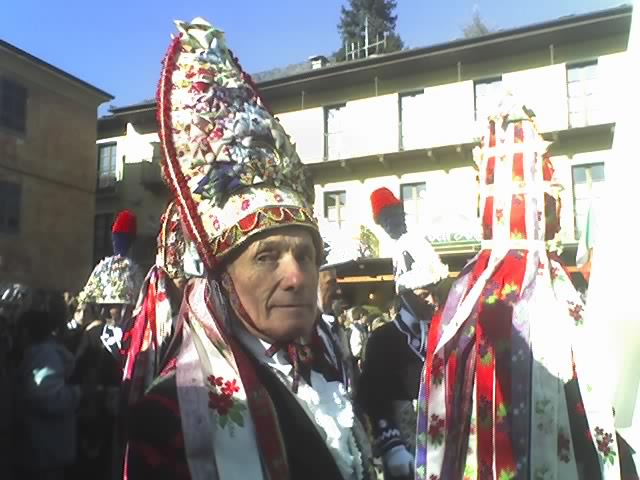

The baìo (also known as "Baìo di Sampeyre") is a traditional festival that takes place every five years in the municipality of Sampeyre, in the Valle Varaita in the province of Cuneo, Italy. The "Baìo di Sampeyre" was one of the most important and ancient traditional festivals in the Italian Alps. The long-awaited return of the festival in the year 2012 began on February 5 and concluded on February 16, the final Thursday before Lent (a day that is also celebrated as Fat Thursday).

== Origins and tradition ==
The tradition's origins date back to between 975 and 980, when teams of Saracens, who had penetrated the valley to control the Alpine passes, were driven away by the local population. The festival commemorates the expulsion of the invaders.

The Baìo is composed of four parades (or "armies"), coming from the provincial capital, Sampeyre (Piasso), and its three hamlets: Rore (Rure), Calchesio (Chucheis), and Villar (Vilà). Traditionally, only men participated in the parades, and the complicated costumes were woven by the women. The men traditionally interpreted the roles of women, a custom that led to the event being accused of machismo.

One of its most important parts is the dance. The Valle Varaita is an important centre for the maintenance and the rediscovery of Occitan traditions. The people maintained many traditional dances and folklore as well as music. The sounds of violins, accordions, organs, clarinets and hurdy-gurdy (sonsaina in Occitan) are heard during traditional dances such as courento, gigo, courento di custiole, countradanso, tresso, bureo d'San Martin, bureo vieìo, and others.

== Script ==
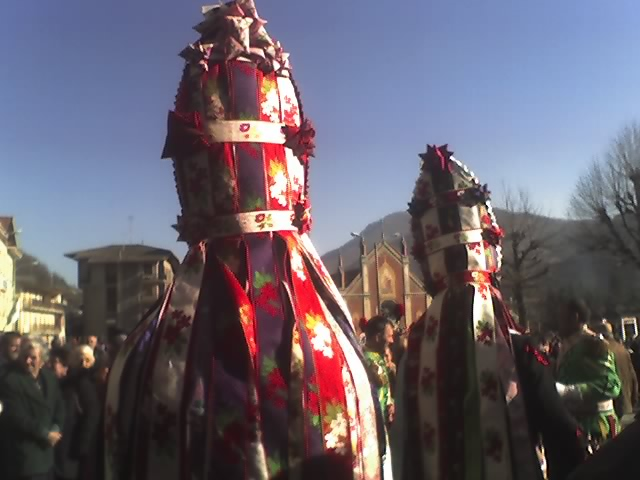
Festivities in motion

The events and gatherings of the various parts of the Baìo follow a precise and traditional format.

On the second Sunday before Fat Thursday (the Thursday before lent), four processions parade within the villages, except for the inhabitants of Calchesio (in Italy) who go to Sampeyre to meet the cortege of Piasso.

The following Sunday the various Baìo start at a time of Sampeyre where the solemn meeting: Abba (the generals, called the Hebrew father) exchange greetings with swords and parade to the square where four groups form and the participants dance.

During the procession, the parade meets barriers of logs that symbolize the obstacles left by the Saracens during their flight. These barricades are torn down by sapeurs ("zappatori" in Occitan, and "guastatore" in French) using axes. This is followed by dancing and refreshments.

On Fat Thursday, the inhabitants, except those in Villar, parade again from Sampeyre and return to their village for the finale of the party. The "process treasurer" tries to escape with cash with the help of a secretary but is apprehended, tried and pardoned by all of Baìo; they are then transported and retried in Villar where they are executed.

== Characters ==
Cavalìe – are the cavalry of villagers, and open the procession of Calchesio and Sampeyre.

Tambourn major – leads the procession of Calchesio and Villar, waving a long baton in time to music.

Arlequin – is the "Marshal" of the Baìo, who must frighten people to prevent the march.

Sarazine – girls waving a white handkerchief as a signal code for the army of liberation, played by very young children.

Segnourine – dressed in white to symbolize the end of slavery by Saracens, are played by boys between the ages of 10 and 16 years.

Tambourin – A small group who announce the parade with timballos (small drums) and Tambourines who also mark the pace of travel.

Sapeur – armed with axes, remove the barriers of logs left by fleeing Saracens.

Grec – in the parades of Rore, and Calchesio Sampeyre; are young people from 17 to 30 years portraying the Greek prisoners who were freed by the villagers.

Escarlinìe – the infantry of villagers, who are armed with clubs decorated with ivy, colored ribbons and bells.

Espous – pairs of young married couples, who are confined to one for the procession of Rore.

Segnouri – the wealthy who can now live freely without fear of looting by Saracens, the parades of Rore, Sampeyre and Villar.

Sounadour – the parade of musicians who play for dancing, occasionally for more than twenty-four hours without interruption.

Uzuart – guards accompanying the Alum, armed with swords or rifles.

Granatìe – accompany the Tezourìe (treasurer) and executioner - only Villar. Morou (Moor) – travel by mule as the prisoners are freed from the Saracens.

Turc – Saracens taken prisoner, chained, traveling on foot and are only Sampeyre.

Viéi and Viéio (the old man and the old woman) – characters who close the parade in a ridiculous manner, wheezing and pretending to be unable to keep pace. They are dressed in rags and carry a basket containing a child (a doll) and a fiascone of wine.

Cantinìe (cantiniere) – run up and down the parade serving drinks.

== Alum and Abà ==
The Alum represent the "military" of the Baìo and are elected every five years. Each time a Baìo ends, new Alum are elected. The two new Alum start with the rank of 'Tenent' (lieutenant) Sampeyre, Calchesio and Villar, while Rore is called 'Soutportobandiero' (low flagbearer). Within ten years, the two Alum of Rore become 'Portobandiero' (flagbearers) and finally Abà, the army commanders and organizers of the festival (who are responsible for running from house to house every night during the months preceding the festival, and agree with every family on the roles to be filled). After being Abà, the two become 'Secretaries' (instructed to keep records on Baìo) and 'Tezourìe' (treasurers, who are responsible for managing the funds for the feast). Once they have finished their careers, they are free to take on another role or start a new career.

== See also ==
- Occitania
- Occitan Valleys
- Occitan folk music
