= Silk Mill of Caraglio =

Historic building in Caraglio, Italy

Filatoio Rosso di Caraglio Museo del Setificio Piemontese
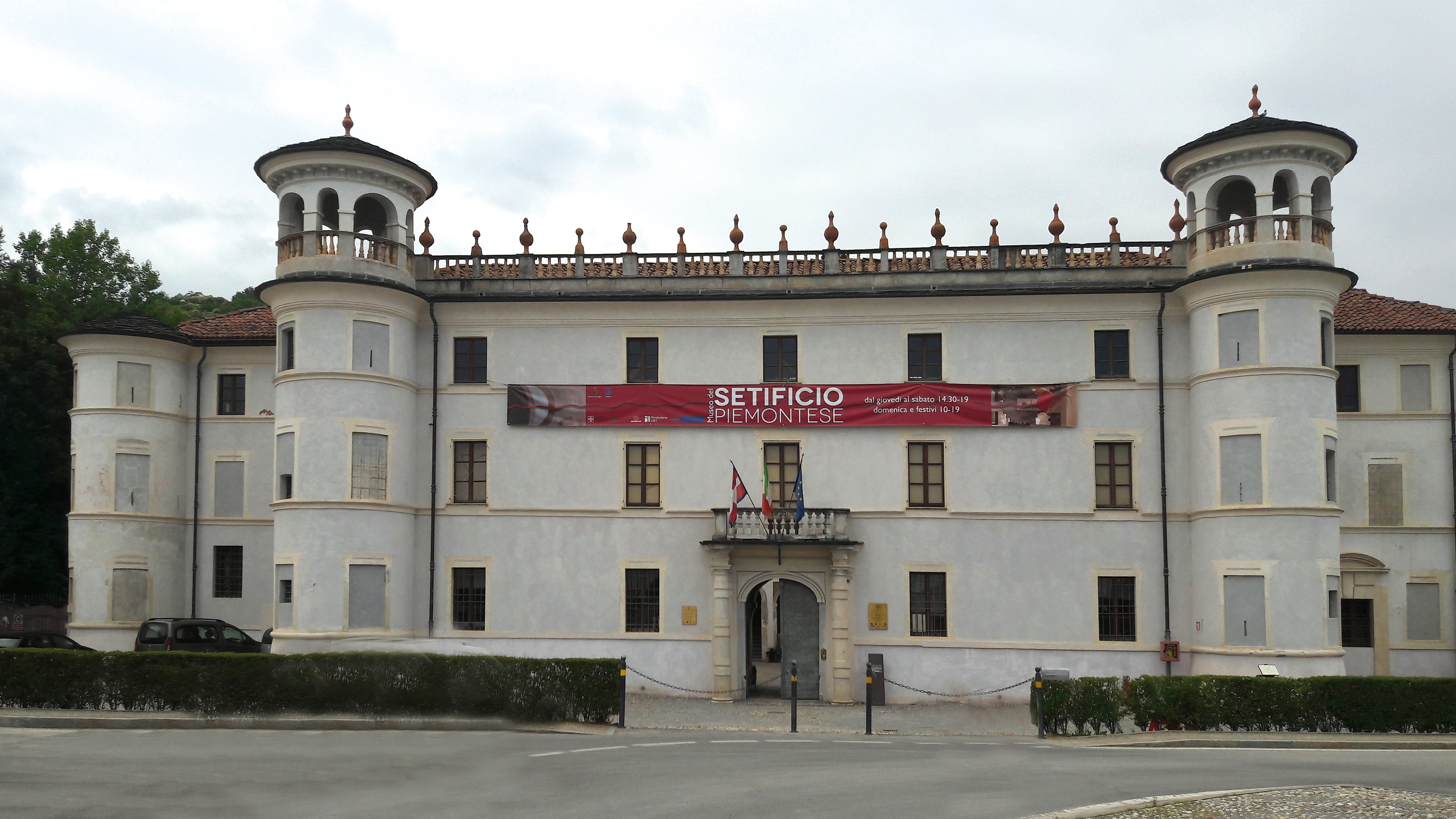
- Established: 1676
- Location: Caraglio, Italy
- Type: History of industry

The Filatoio Rosso di Caraglio (Silk Mill of Caraglio) is a historic building located on the outskirts of Caraglio, a town in the province of Cuneo. It houses the Piedmontese Silk Mill Museum, and is a site of cultural events for the area. It is considered to be one of the oldest preserved industrial sites in Europe. Built between 1676 and 1678 on the initiative of Count Giovanni Girolamo Galleani, it was one of the first silk production plants in the Duchy of Savoy and throughout Europe. The enterprise covered the entire production chain of the silk thread from the cultivation of mulberry trees in the surrounding countryside for the breeding of silkworms to the processing of the silk cocoons and creation of the finished product. It was one of the first water-powered spinning mills built in Piedmont.

== History ==
The industrial complex was developed by Count Giovanni Girolamo Galleani who moved from Bologna to Duchy of Savoy in 1676 bringing with him textile machinery invented in the Bologna silk trade. The construction of the large factory was completed in just two years. It was complex of turreted buildings surrounded by city walls and with two large internal courtyards, which also housed the living quarters of the Galleani family.

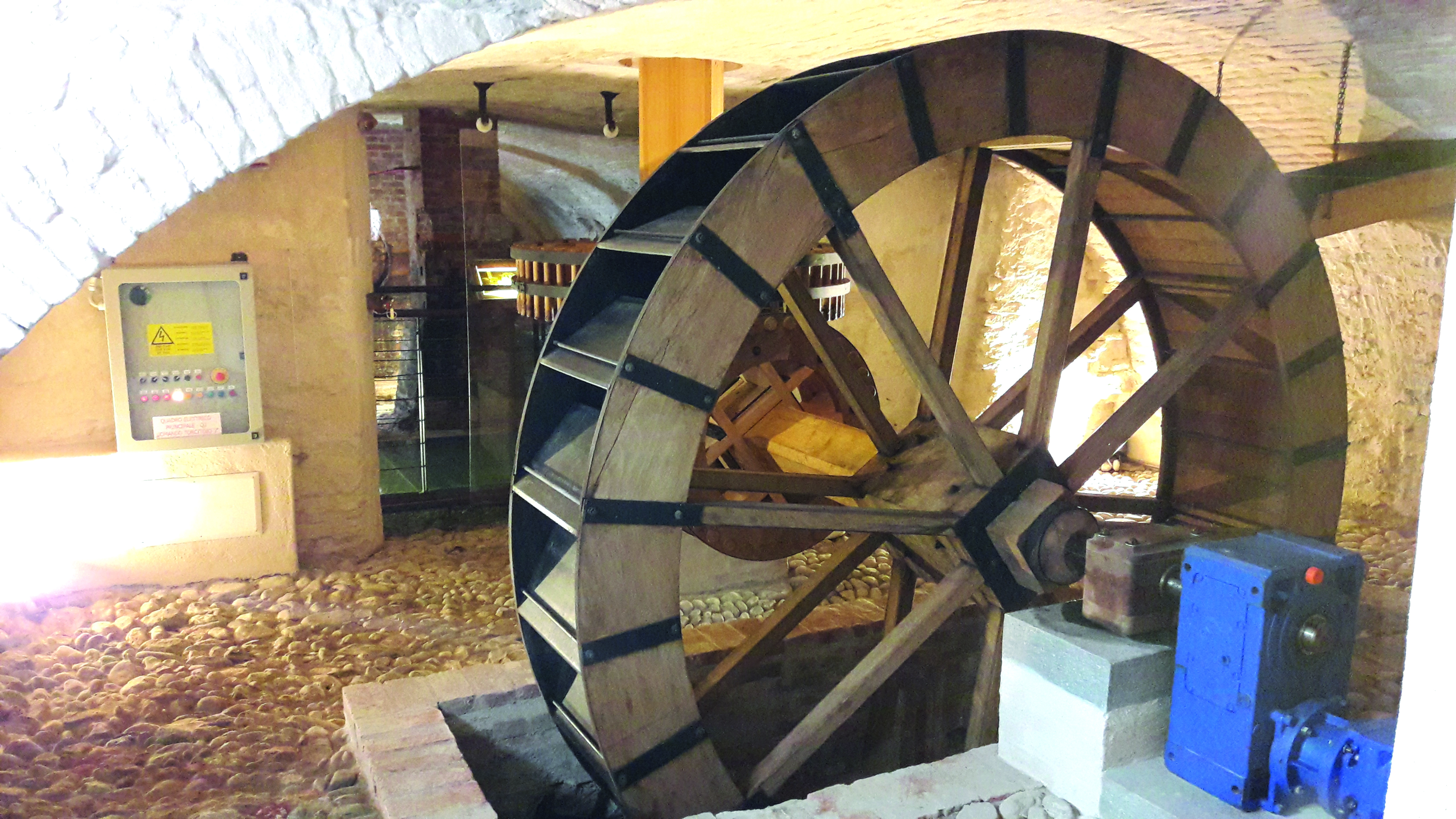
The water wheel of one of the two rebuilt mills

The decision to establish a production plant in the territory of Caraglio was motivated by three fundamental elements: the possibility of cultivating mulberry trees in the surrounding countryside; the presence of skilled workers; and the ample supply of water nearby. A canal was dug from nearby waterways to feed the water mills inside the factory. The mills returned the waste water to the countryside where it could be used.

The silk factory began production in 1678 and was a model for other spinning mills that subsequently emerged in numerous municipalities in the Cuneo area : Alba, Bene Vagienna, Boves, Busca, Carrù, Cavallerleone, Govone, Manta, Mondovì, Monesiglio, Racconigi, Revello, Villanovetta and the same Cuneo. The Caraglio plant had five mills that operated the machinery and hosted the entire production chain: from the breeding of the baco from silk to the realization of the finished silk thread product. It provided work for about three hundred people, mostly women, called "maestre" (masters) for their expertise in producing the quality silk thread. These "maestre" also served to recruit and train new workers, usually young girls, who then migrated to the factory site.

It specialized in the production of the "Piedmontese organzine", a double-twisted silk yarn that was purchased by French silk weavers. According to British merchants Lewis and Loubière in the eighteenth century, it was "the finest silk produced in Europe" and was used to make the warp of fine fabrics for the aristocracy.

In 1857 the descendants of the Galleani family sold the factory to the Cassin banking family after the Pébrine epidemic struck the mulberry crops and the silkworms throughout Europe, which led to the need to import silkworm eggs and cocoons from the Far East.

The production continued until 1936, the year in which the spinning factory definitively ceased activity, a decision made necessary also following the new policy of economic self-sufficiency imposed by fascist regime which promoted the production of alternative textile yarns such as viscose and fustian, the latter derived from cotton cultivated in the Italian colonies of 'Africa. The factory was used as a military barracks during the period of the Second World War and was damaged by aerial bombardments which destroyed one of its six perimeter towers.

In 1993 the Council of Europe recognized the spinning factory as "the most important historical-cultural monument of industrial archeology in Piedmont" and in 1999 the entire complex was acquired by the Municipality of Caraglio with the intention of restoring it.

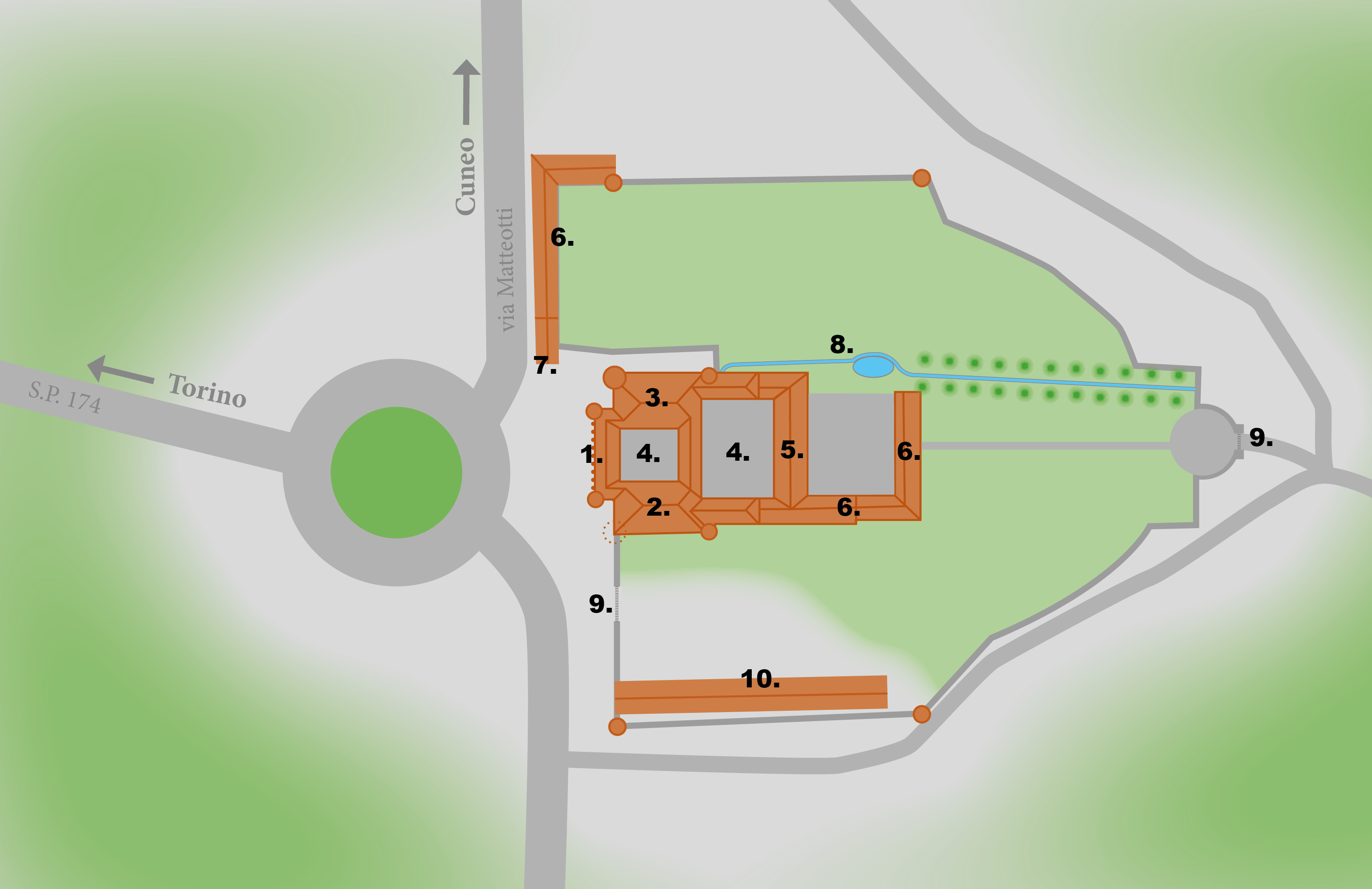
1. Main entrance, ticket office, bookshop; 2. Right wing with offices, exhibition rooms and main apartments; 3. Left wing that houses the Piedmontese Silk Factory Museum; 4. Internal court; 5. Hall of Columns; 6. Technical rooms and warehouses; 7. Church; 8. Water channel and catchment basin; 9. Secondary access; 10. Old stables, storage rooms

Thanks to the financial support of the Piedmont Region, the Compagnia di San Paolo, the Cassa di Risparmio di Cuneo Foundation and various local credit institutions, the Filatoio Rosso di Caraglio was completely renovated, becoming the oldest preserved silk factory in Europe. The building houses the Artea Foundation which promotes cultural events and houses the Museum of the Piedmontese Silk Factory, which boasts a complete set of faithful reproductions of functioning wooden machinery reconstructed on the basis of documentary sources preserved in the historical archives of Cuneo and Turin.

== The museum ==
The Museo del Setificio Piemontese (Piedmontese Silk Factory Museum) exhibits technologies used in the process of silk thread manufacture and the machinery involved in each step. It includes two two-story water-powered machines that were used in throwing (twisting) the silk thread.
