= Syrianarpia mendicalis =

Scientific classification
- Kingdom: Animalia
- Phylum: Arthropoda
- Class: Insecta
- Order: Lepidoptera
- Family: Crambidae
- Genus: Syrianarpia
- Species: S. mendicalis

Binomial name
- Syrianarpia mendicalis (Staudinger, 1879)

Synonyms
- Metasia mendicalis Staudinger, 1879; Syrianarpia mendicalis fuscella P. Leraut, 1982; Syrianarpia osthelderi osthelderi P. Leraut, 1982

Species of moth

Syrianarpia mendicalis is a species of moth in the family Crambidae. It is found in Ukraine (the Crimea), Turkey and Iran.
