= Vignolo =

- Comune
- Comune di Vignolo
- Location within Italy Location within Piedmont
- Coordinates: 44°22′N 7°28′E
- Country: Italy
- Region: Piedmont
- Province: Province of Cuneo (CN)

Area
  - Total: 8.1 km^{2} (3.1 sq mi)

Population (Dec. 2004)
  - Total: 2,112
  - Density: 260/km^{2} (680/sq mi)
- Time zone: UTC+1 (CET)
  - Summer (DST): UTC+2 (CEST)
- Postal code: 12010
- Dialing code: 0171

Vignolo is a comune (municipality) in the Province of Cuneo in the Italian region Piedmont, located about 80 kilometres (50 mi) south of Turin and about 7 kilometres (4 mi) southwest of Cuneo. As of 31 December 2004, it had a population of 2,112 and an area of 8.1 square kilometres (3.1 mi^{2}).

Vignolo borders the following municipalities: Borgo San Dalmazzo, Cervasca, Cuneo, and Roccasparvera.

== Demographic evolution ==
Historical population

Year	Pop.	±%
1861	1,317	—
1871	1,439	+9.3%
1881	1,689	+17.4%
1901	1,726	+2.2%
1911	1,685	−2.4%

Year	Pop.	±%
1921	1,599	−5.1%
1931	1,533	−4.1%
1936	1,476	−3.7%
1951	1,373	−7.0%
1961	1,239	−9.8%

Year	Pop.	±%
1971	1,263	+1.9%
1981	1,526	+20.8%
1991	1,745	+14.4%
2001	2,054	+17.7%

Source: Data from ISTAT
