= Bernezzo =

Bernezzo Bernès
- Comune
- Comune di Bernezzo
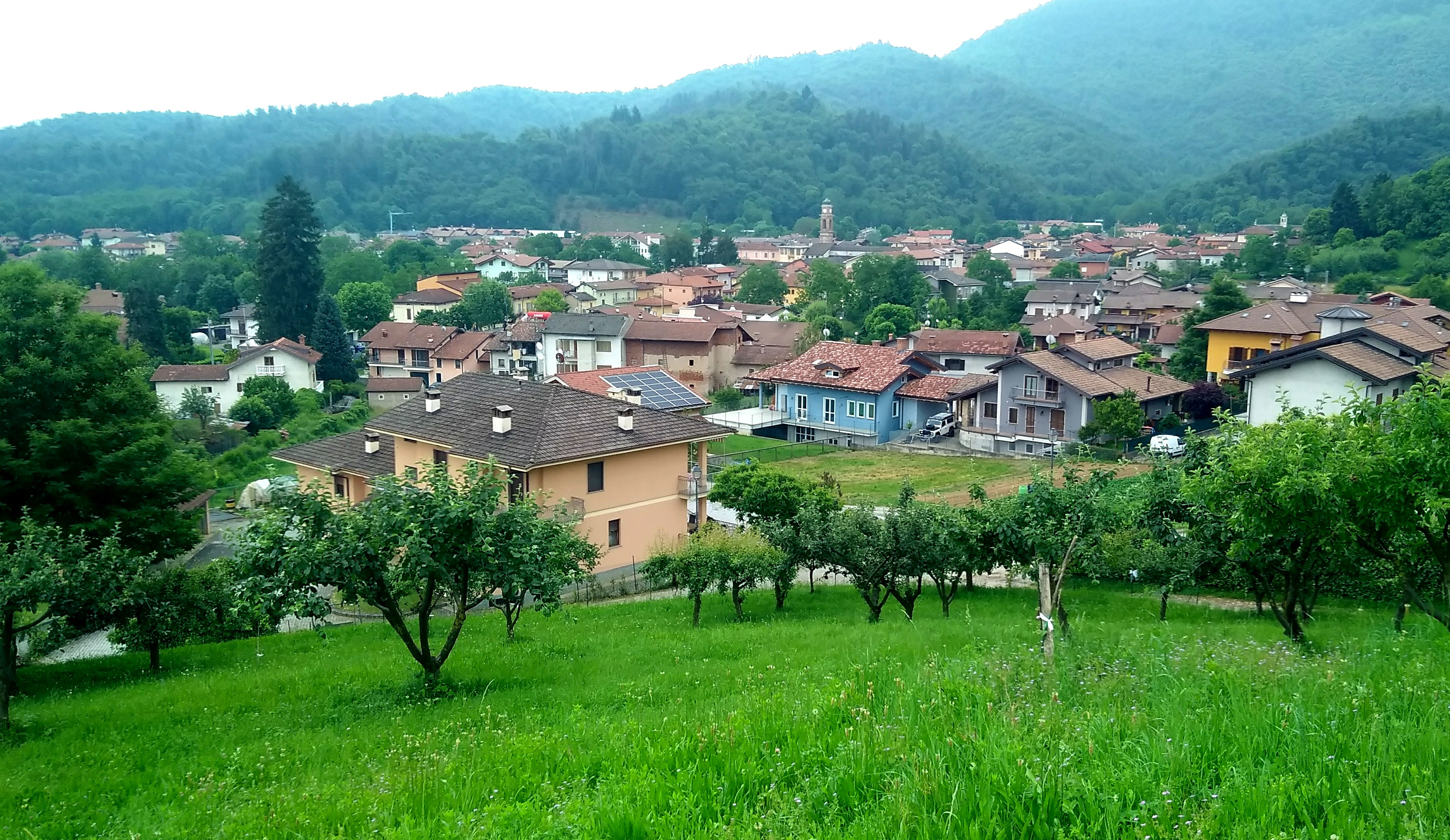

- Coat of arms

- Location within Italy Location within Piedmont
- Coordinates: 44°23′N 7°26′E
- Country: Italy
- Region: Piedmont
- Province: Cuneo (CN)

Government
  - Mayor: Laura Delfina Vietto

Area
  - Total: 25.9 km^{2} (10.0 sq mi)
- Elevation: 565 m (1,854 ft)

Population (30 April 2017)
  - Total: 4,123
  - Density: 159/km^{2} (412/sq mi)
- Demonym: Bernezzesi
- Time zone: UTC+1 (CET)
  - Summer (DST): UTC+2 (CEST)
- Postal code: 12010
- Dialing code: 0171
- Website: Official website

Bernezzo (Occitan, Bernès) is a comune (municipality) in the Province of Cuneo in the Italian region Piedmont, located about 80 kilometres (50 mi) southwest of Turin and about 9 kilometres (6 mi) west of Cuneo.

Bernezzo borders the following municipalities: Caraglio, Cervasca, Rittana, Roccasparvera, and Valgrana.

== History ==
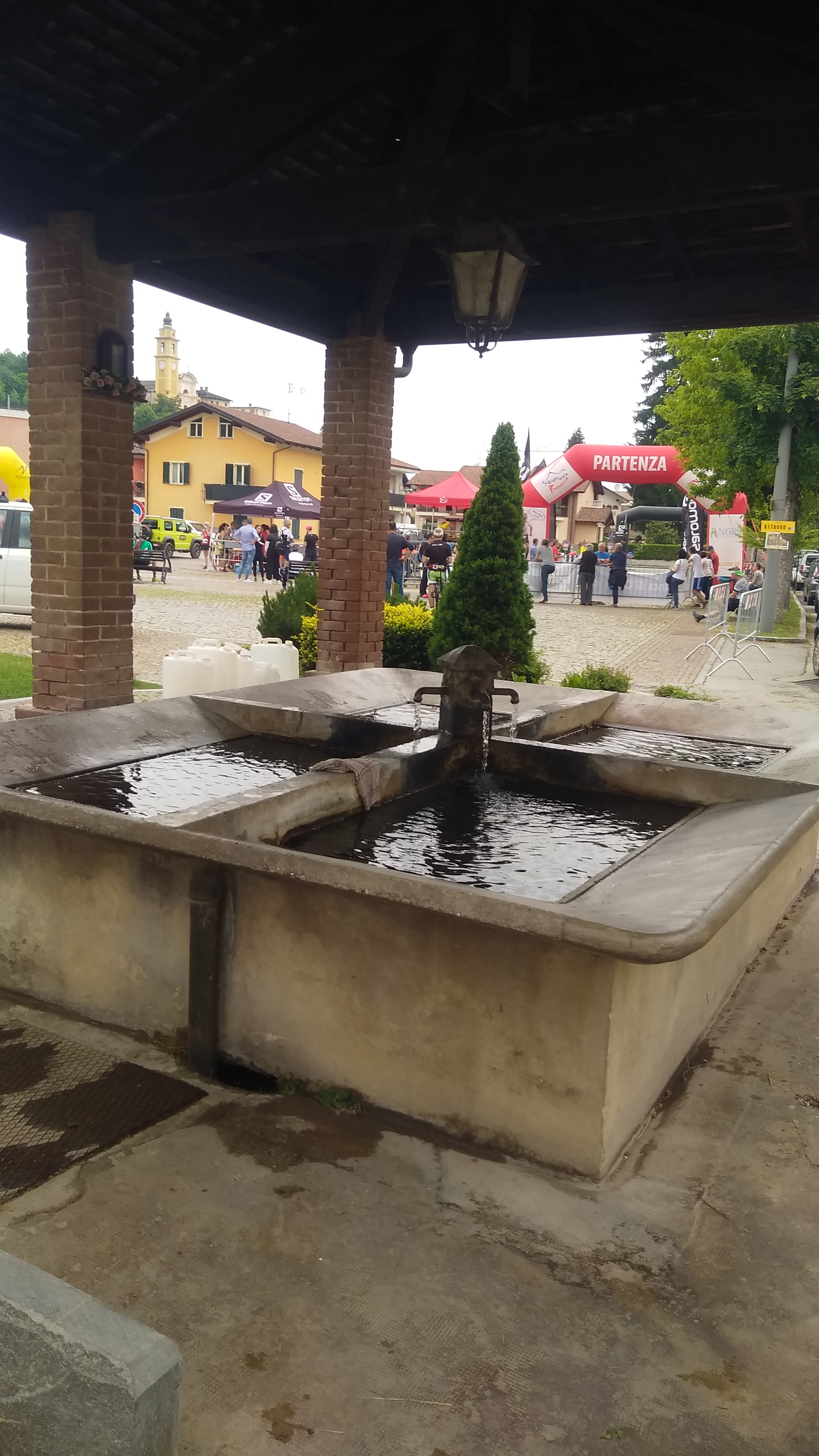
Il vecchio lavatoio

The town of Bernezzo is presumed to have medieval origins; it is likely that in the 6th-7th century AD, a community of farmers settled in the area. The earliest documents concerning the town date back to the year 1000, depicting it as a small agricultural community, not unlike neighboring towns such as Caraglio, Cervasca or Sant'Anna. In 1198, Bernezzo participated in the Caraglio uprising: the inhabitants of Caraglio, tired of their local lord, rebelled and received significant aid from nearby communities, including Bernezzo. The uprising was successful, the despot was killed, and his troops were defeated, giving rise to the city of Cuneo. However, the first documented evidence of the existence of Bernezzo, where its name appears, dates back to March 4, 1223, in a peace treaty between the Marchese di Saluzzo, Manfredo III, and the Count of Savoy, Tomaso. Three brothers, Nicolao, Ogerio, and Guglielmo, lords of Bernezzo, are mentioned in this treaty, aligned with the Count of Savoy. According to the treaty, the town came under the rule of the Marquis of Saluzzo, and subsequently, along with the entire Cuneo territory, fell briefly under the rule of the Angevins until 1274.

As indicated in a document from 1417, communities adhering to medieval heretical movements that preceded the Reformation had settled in the town, particularly widespread in Piedmont. Among these communities, predominantly Waldensian, 22 residents of Bernezzo were prosecuted and condemned to the stake in the city of Cuneo.

Until the first half of the 15th century, Bernezzo did not have its own statute. Only in 1470 was a statutory code related to rural bans with penalties and fines approved. The population at that time was estimated to be just under 1000 inhabitants (based on the "fuochi", the families paying the hearth tax in Bernezzo). The town was later annexed to the Savoyard kingdom and eventually to the kingdom of Italy.

During the Great War, Bernezzo experienced the same fate as many Italian valleys: a drastic decline in population as families, deprived of labor for cultivating the land, preferred to move to the plains. During the Second World War, the town provided many young people for the disastrous Russian campaign, leaving a deep scar on the entire province of Cuneo and becoming part of the local culture. From 1943 until the end of the war, Bernezzo became a point of reference for partisans who received aid and protection from the local population.
