= Brondello =

- Comune
- Comune di Brondello
- Coat of arms

- Location within Italy Location within Piedmont
- Coordinates: 44°35′N 7°24′E
- Country: Italy
- Region: Piedmont
- Province: Province of Cuneo (CN)

Area
  - Total: 9.9 km^{2} (3.8 sq mi)

Population (Dec. 2004)
  - Total: 349
  - Density: 35/km^{2} (91/sq mi)
- Time zone: UTC+1 (CET)
  - Summer (DST): UTC+2 (CEST)
- Postal code: 12030
- Dialing code: 0175

Brondello is a comune (municipality) in the Province of Cuneo in the Italian region Piedmont, located about 60 kilometres (37 mi) southwest of Turin and about 25 kilometres (16 mi) northwest of Cuneo. As of 31 December 2004, it had a population of 349 and an area of 9.9 square kilometres (3.8 mi^{2}). Brondello borders the following municipalities: Isasca, Martiniana Po, Pagno, Revello, and Venasca.

== Demographic evolution ==
Historical population

Year	Pop.	±%
1861	959	—
1871	1,060	+10.5%
1881	1,053	−0.7%
1901	1,001	−4.9%
1911	1,014	+1.3%

Year	Pop.	±%
1921	922	−9.1%
1931	917	−0.5%
1936	849	−7.4%
1951	772	−9.1%
1961	581	−24.7%

Year	Pop.	±%
1971	427	−26.5%
1981	341	−20.1%
1991	330	−3.2%
2001	349	+5.8%

Source: Data from ISTAT
