= Gambasca =

- Comune
- Comune di Gambasca
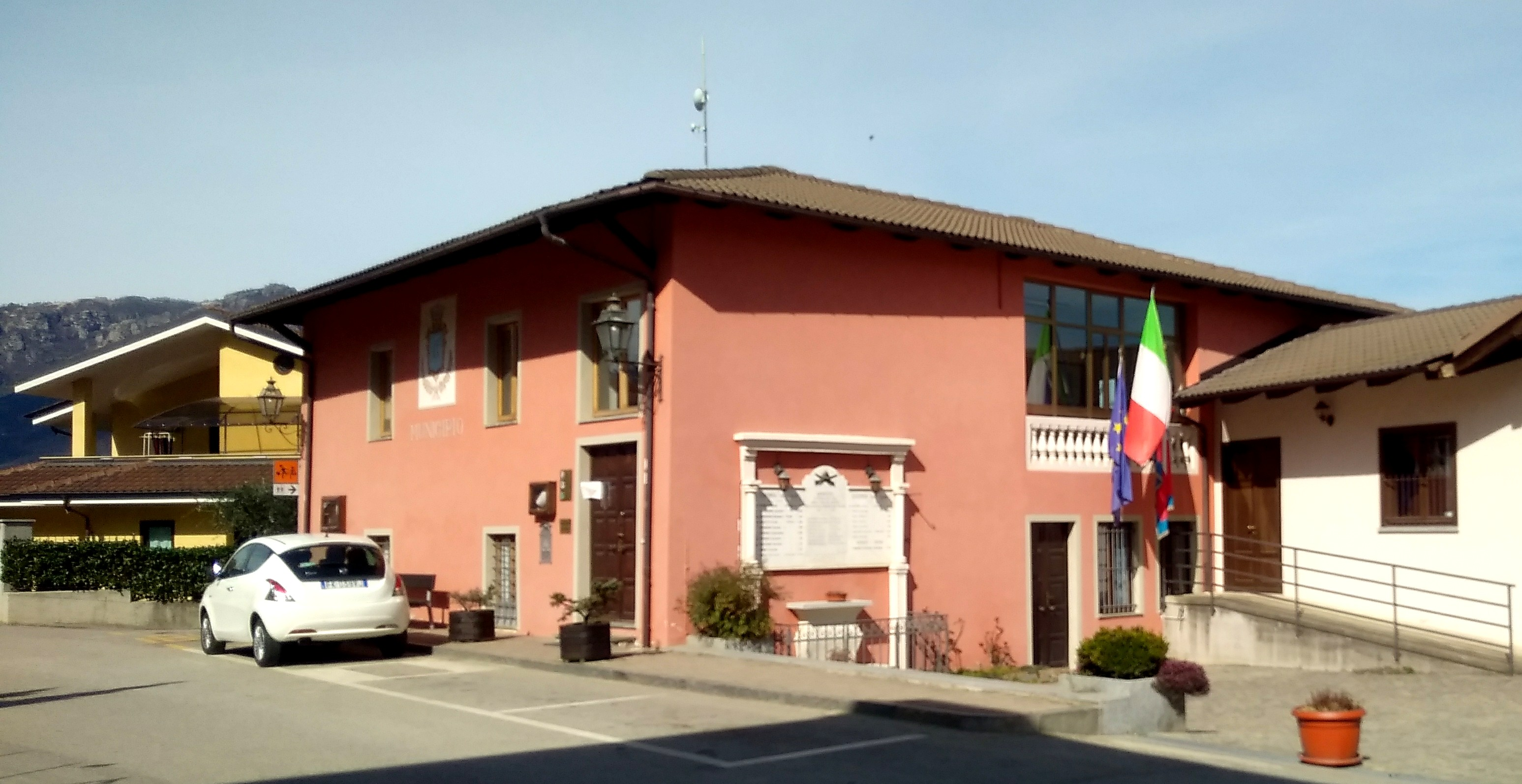
- Town hall

- Location within Italy Location within Piedmont
- Coordinates: 44°38′N 7°21′E
- Country: Italy
- Region: Piedmont
- Province: Cuneo (CN)

Government
  - Mayor: Cristiana Nasi

Area
  - Total: 5.8 km^{2} (2.2 sq mi)
- Elevation: 479 m (1,572 ft)

Population (31 August 2017)
  - Total: 355
  - Density: 61/km^{2} (160/sq mi)
- Demonym: Gambaschesi
- Time zone: UTC+1 (CET)
  - Summer (DST): UTC+2 (CEST)
- Postal code: 12030
- Dialing code: 0175
- Website: Official website

Gambasca is a comune (municipality) in the Province of Cuneo in the Italian region Piedmont, located about 60 kilometres (37 mi) southwest of Turin and about 30 kilometres (19 mi) northwest of Cuneo.

Gambasca borders the following municipalities: Brossasco, Martiniana Po, Revello, Rifreddo, and Sanfront.
