= Martiniana Po =

- Comune
- Comune di Martiniana Po
- Coat of arms

- Location within Italy Location within Piedmont
- Coordinates: 44°35′N 7°24′E
- Country: Italy
- Region: Piedmont
- Province: Cuneo (CN)

Government
  - Mayor: Bruno Allasia

Area
  - Total: 13.0 km^{2} (5.0 sq mi)
- Elevation: 478 m (1,568 ft)

Population (30 September 2017)
  - Total: 773
  - Density: 59.5/km^{2} (154/sq mi)
- Demonym: Martinianesi
- Time zone: UTC+1 (CET)
  - Summer (DST): UTC+2 (CEST)
- Postal code: 12030
- Dialing code: 0175
- Website: Official website

Martiniana Po is a comune (municipality) in the Province of Cuneo in the Italian region Piedmont, located about 60 kilometres (37 mi) southwest of Turin and about 25 kilometres (16 mi) northwest of Cuneo. It is located in the lower Valle Po across the Po River.

Martiniana Po borders the following municipalities: Brondello, Brossasco, Gambasca, Isasca, and Revello.
