= Roccasparvera =

Municipality in Piedmont, Italy

- Comune
- Comune di Roccasparvera
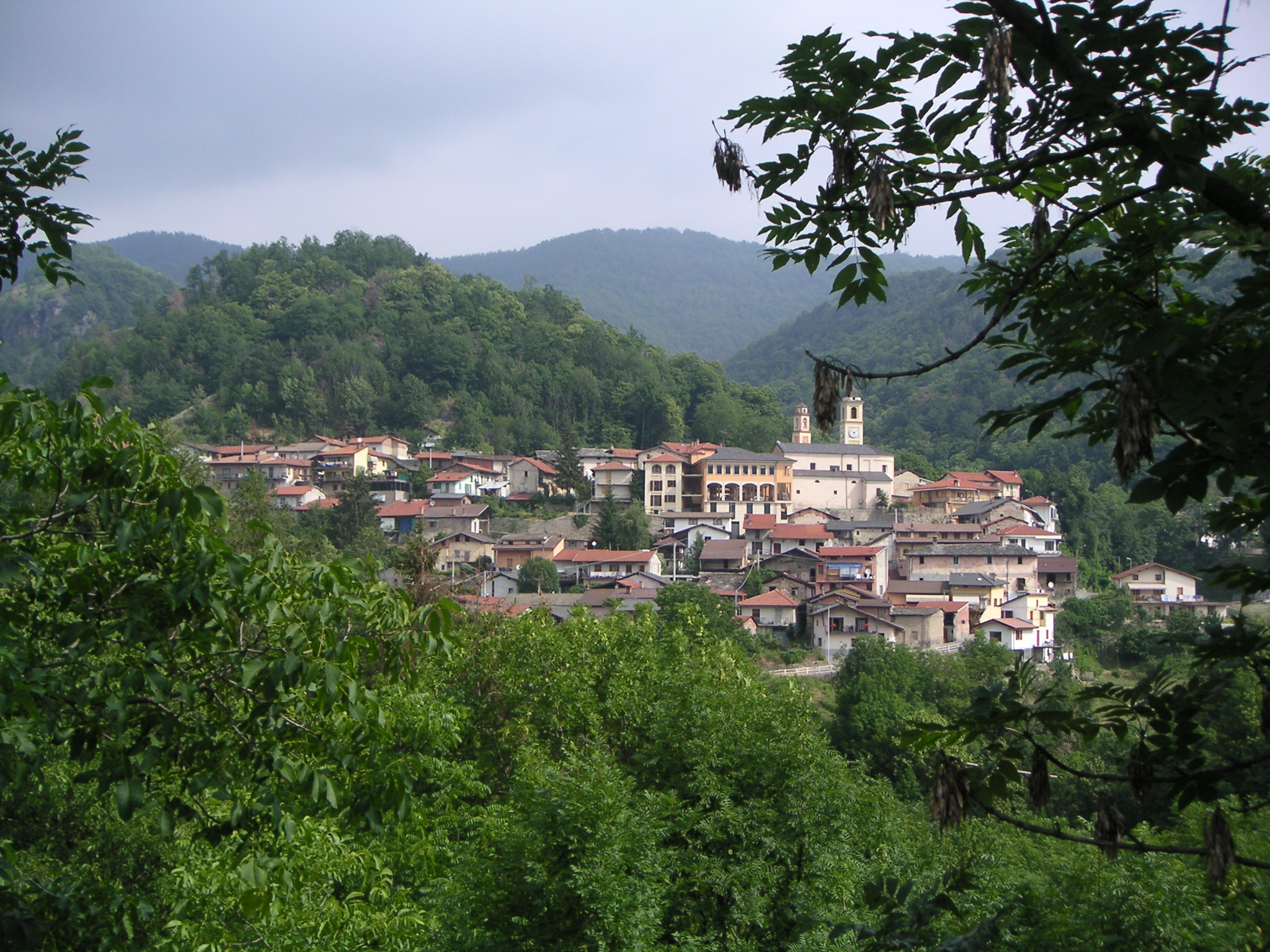

- Coat of arms

- Location within Italy Location within Piedmont
- Coordinates: 44°20′N 7°27′E
- Country: Italy
- Region: Piedmont
- Province: Cuneo (CN)

Government
  - Mayor: Guido Olivero

Area
  - Total: 11.0 km^{2} (4.2 sq mi)
- Elevation: 674 m (2,211 ft)

Population (31 December 2010)
  - Total: 737
  - Density: 67.0/km^{2} (174/sq mi)
- Demonym: Roccasparveresi
- Time zone: UTC+1 (CET)
  - Summer (DST): UTC+2 (CEST)
- Postal code: 12010
- Dialing code: 0171

Roccasparvera is a comune (municipality) in the Province of Cuneo in the Italian region Piedmont, located about 80 kilometres (50 mi) south of Turin and about 10 kilometres (6 mi) southwest of Cuneo.

Roccasparvera borders the following municipalities: Bernezzo, Borgo San Dalmazzo, Cervasca, Gaiola, Rittana, and Vignolo.

== Twin towns ==
- Reillanne, France (1996)
