= Montemale di Cuneo =

- Comune
- Comune di Montemale di Cuneo
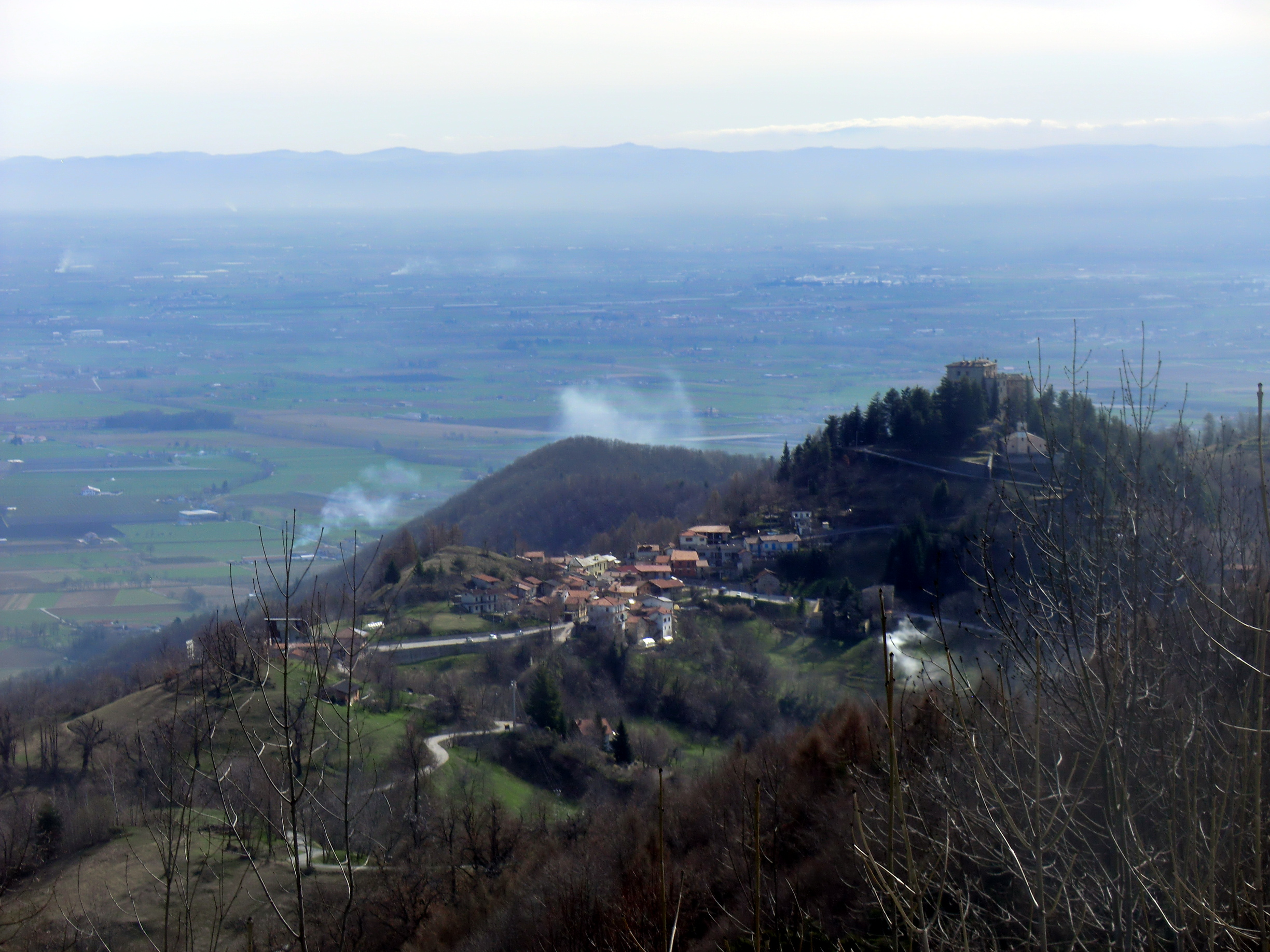

- Coat of arms

- Location within Italy Location within Piedmont
- Coordinates: 44°26′N 7°23′E
- Country: Italy
- Region: Piedmont
- Province: Cuneo (CN)

Government
  - Mayor: Oscar Virano

Area
  - Total: 11.6 km^{2} (4.5 sq mi)
- Elevation: 961 m (3,153 ft)

Population (31 December 2013)
  - Total: 225
  - Density: 19.4/km^{2} (50.2/sq mi)
- Demonym: Montemalesi
- Time zone: UTC+1 (CET)
  - Summer (DST): UTC+2 (CEST)
- Postal code: 12025
- Dialing code: 0171
- Website: Official website

Montemale di Cuneo is a comune (municipality) in the Province of Cuneo in the Italian region Piedmont, located about 70 kilometres (43 mi) southwest of Turin and about 14 kilometres (9 mi) northwest of Cuneo.

Montemale di Cuneo borders the following municipalities: Caraglio, Dronero, Monterosso Grana, and Valgrana.
