= Cervasca =

- Comune
- Comune di Cervasca
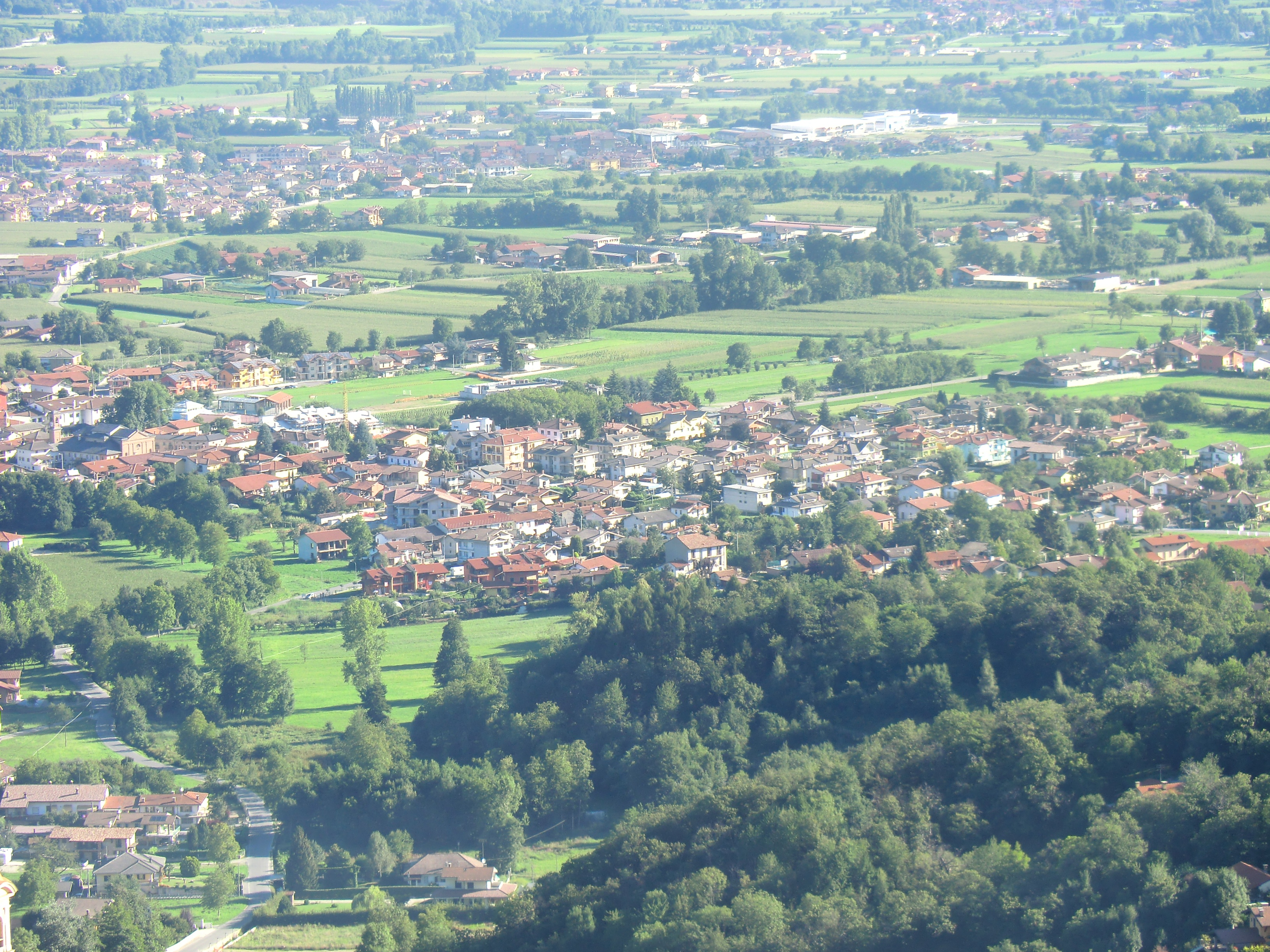

- Location within Italy Location within Piedmont
- Coordinates: 44°23′N 7°28′E
- Country: Italy
- Region: Piedmont
- Province: Cuneo (CN)

Government
  - Mayor: Aldo Serale

Area
  - Total: 18.3 km^{2} (7.1 sq mi)
- Elevation: 578 m (1,896 ft)

Population (30 June 2017)
  - Total: 5,100
  - Density: 280/km^{2} (720/sq mi)
- Demonym: Cervaschesi
- Time zone: UTC+1 (CET)
  - Summer (DST): UTC+2 (CEST)
- Postal code: 12010
- Dialing code: 0171
- Patron saint: Madonna del Carmine
- Saint day: 16 July
- Website: Official website

Cervasca is a comune (municipality) in the Province of Cuneo in the Italian region Piedmont, located about 80 kilometres (50 mi) south of Turin and about 7 kilometres (4 mi) west of Cuneo.

Cervasca borders the following municipalities: Bernezzo, Caraglio, Cuneo, Roccasparvera, and Vignolo.

== Twin towns ==
Cervasca is twinned with:

- Allos, France
