= Pagno =

- Comune
- Comune di Pagno
- Location within Italy Location within Piedmont
- Coordinates: 44°37′N 7°26′E
- Country: Italy
- Region: Piedmont
- Province: Province of Cuneo (CN)

Area
  - Total: 8.4 km^{2} (3.2 sq mi)

Population (Dec. 2004)
  - Total: 564
  - Density: 67/km^{2} (170/sq mi)
- Time zone: UTC+1 (CET)
  - Summer (DST): UTC+2 (CEST)
- Postal code: 12030
- Dialing code: 0175

Pagno is a comune (municipality) in the Province of Cuneo in the Italian region of Piedmont. It is located about 50 kilometres (31 mi) southwest of Turin and about 30 kilometres (19 mi) northwest of Cuneo. It covers an area of 8.4 square kilometres (3.2 mi^{2}) and as of 31 December 2004 has a population of 564.

Pagno borders the municipalities of Brondello, Manta, Piasco, Revello, Saluzzo, Venasca, and Verzuolo.

== Demographic evolution ==
Historical population

Year	Pop.	±%
1861	908	—
1871	980	+7.9%
1881	989	+0.9%
1901	952	−3.7%
1911	893	−6.2%

Year	Pop.	±%
1921	907	+1.6%
1931	849	−6.4%
1936	853	+0.5%
1951	772	−9.5%
1961	607	−21.4%

Year	Pop.	±%
1971	529	−12.9%
1981	539	+1.9%
1991	506	−6.1%
2001	554	+9.5%

Source: Data from ISTAT
