= Brossasco =

- Comune
- Comune di Brossasco
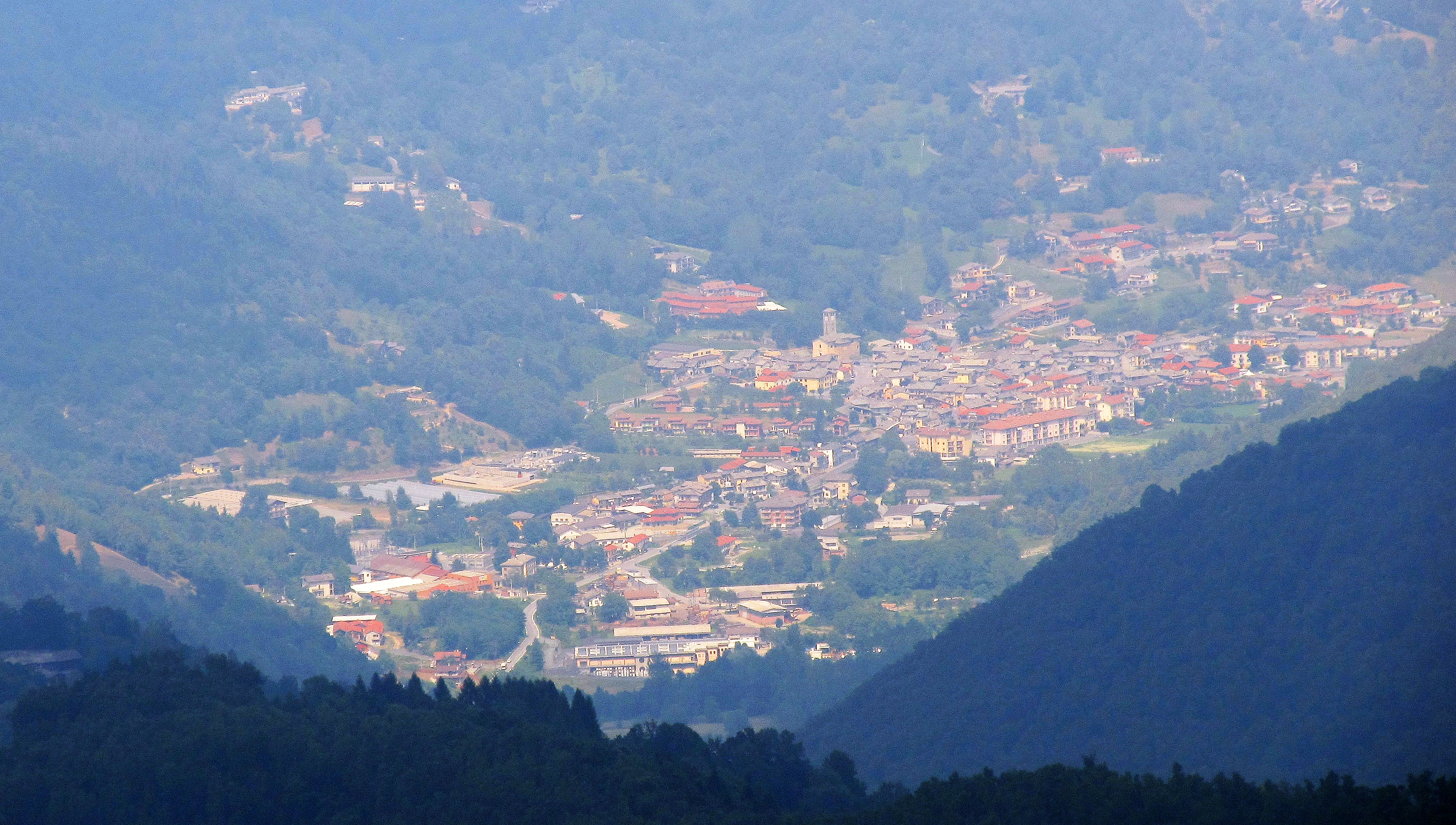

- Coat of arms

- Location within Italy Location within Piedmont
- Coordinates: 44°34′N 7°22′E
- Country: Italy
- Region: Piedmont
- Province: Cuneo (CN)
- Frazioni: Masueria, San Sisto

Government
  - Mayor: Paolo Amorisco

Area
  - Total: 28.2 km^{2} (10.9 sq mi)
- Elevation: 606 m (1,988 ft)

Population (30 April 2017)
  - Total: 1,062
  - Density: 37.7/km^{2} (97.5/sq mi)
- Demonym: Brossaschesi
- Time zone: UTC+1 (CET)
  - Summer (DST): UTC+2 (CEST)
- Postal code: 12020
- Dialing code: 0175
- Patron saint: Madonna della Neve
- Website: Official website

Brossasco is a comune (municipality) in the Province of Cuneo in the Italian region of Piedmont, located about 60 kilometres (37 mi) southwest of Turin and about 25 kilometres (16 mi) northwest of Cuneo.

Brossasco borders the following municipalities: Frassino, Gambasca, Isasca, Martiniana Po, Melle, Sampeyre, Sanfront, Busca and Venasca.
