= Isasca =

- Comune
- Comune di Isasca
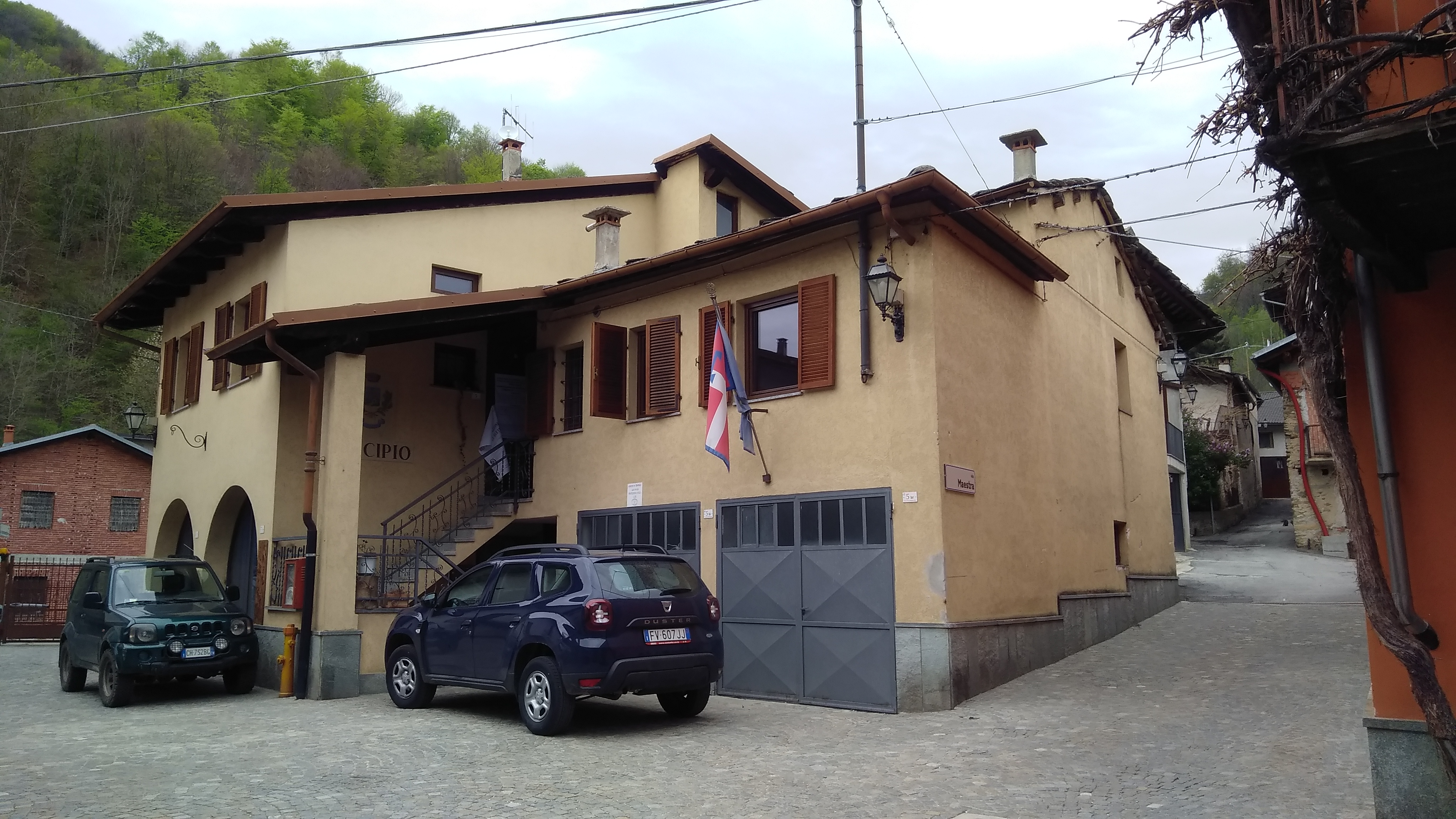
- Town hall

- Coat of arms

- Location within Italy Location within Piedmont
- Coordinates: 44°35′N 7°23′E
- Country: Italy
- Region: Piedmont
- Province: Cuneo (CN)

Government
  - Mayor: Roberto Giovanni Forniglia

Area
  - Total: 5.3 km^{2} (2.0 sq mi)
- Elevation: 660 m (2,170 ft)

Population (31 December 2008)
  - Total: 85
  - Density: 16/km^{2} (42/sq mi)
- Demonym: Isaschesi
- Time zone: UTC+1 (CET)
  - Summer (DST): UTC+2 (CEST)
- Postal code: 12020
- Dialing code: 0175

Isasca is a comune (municipality) in the Province of Cuneo in the Italian region Piedmont, located about 60 kilometres (37 mi) southwest of Turin and about 25 kilometres (16 mi) northwest of Cuneo, in the Valle Varaita.

Isasca borders the following municipalities: Brondello, Brossasco, Martiniana Po, and Venasca.
