= Valgrana =

- Comune
- Comune di Valgrana
- Coat of arms

- Location within Italy Location within Piedmont
- Coordinates: 44°25′N 7°23′E
- Country: Italy
- Region: Piedmont
- Province: Cuneo (CN)

Government
  - Mayor: Albino Arlotto

Area
  - Total: 23.1 km^{2} (8.9 sq mi)
- Elevation: 642 m (2,106 ft)

Population (31 December 2010)
  - Total: 805
  - Density: 34.8/km^{2} (90.3/sq mi)
- Time zone: UTC+1 (CET)
  - Summer (DST): UTC+2 (CEST)
- Postal code: 12020
- Dialing code: 0171

Valgrana is a comune (municipality) in the Province of Cuneo in the Italian region Piedmont, located about 80 kilometres (50 mi) southwest of Turin and about 14 kilometres (9 mi) northwest of Cuneo.

Valgrana borders the following municipalities: Bernezzo, Caraglio, Montemale di Cuneo, Monterosso Grana, and Rittana.
