= Caraglio =

Caraglio Caraj (Piedmontese)
- Comune
- Comune di Caraglio
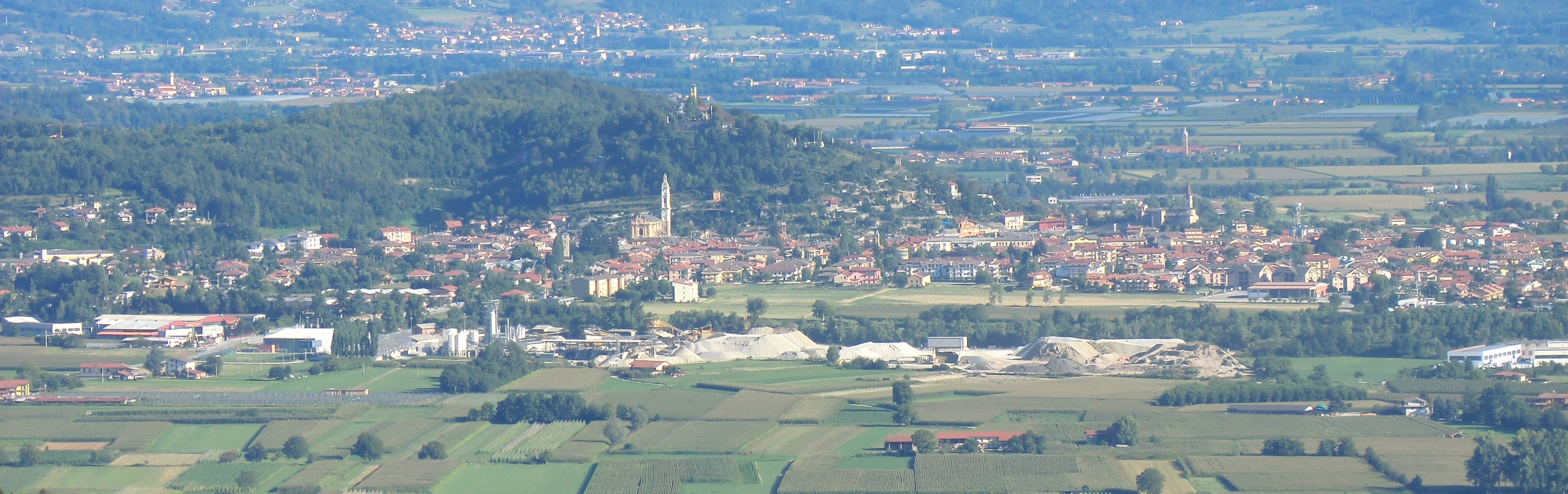

- Location within Italy Location within Piedmont
- Coordinates: 44°25′N 7°26′E
- Country: Italy
- Region: Piedmont
- Province: Cuneo (CN)
- Frazioni: Bottonasco, Cascina Bianca, Cascina Sottana, Grassini, Monturone, Oltre Grana, Palazzasso, Paschera San Carlo (Soprana), Paschera San Defendente (Sottana), Roata Bacias, Roata Borghi, Roata Bruno, Roata Chiabò, Roata Delfino, Roata Fresia, Roata Galliano, Roata Ghio, Roata Lorenzot, Roata Muschia, Rosata Armando, San Lorenzo, Tetto Bellino, Tetto Bianco, Tetto Boscasi

Government
  - Mayor: Giorgio Lerda (civic list)

Area
  - Total: 41.68 km^{2} (16.09 sq mi)
- Elevation: 638 m (2,093 ft)

Population (1-1-2018)
  - Total: 6,782
  - Density: 162.7/km^{2} (421.4/sq mi)
- Demonym(s): sing. caragliese, pl. caragliesi
- Time zone: UTC+1 (CET)
  - Summer (DST): UTC+2 (CEST)
- Postal code: 12023
- Dialing code: 0171

Caraglio (Italian: [kaˈraʎʎo]; Piedmontese: Caraj) is a comune (municipality) in the Province of Cuneo in the Italian region of Piedmont, located about 80 kilometres (50 mi) southwest of Turin and about 10 kilometres (6 mi) northwest of Cuneo. As of 1 January 2018, it had a population of 6,782 and an area of 41.68 km^{2} (16.09 mi^{2}).

The municipality of Caraglio contains the frazioni (subdivisions, mainly villages and hamlets) Bottonasco, Cascina Bianca, Cascina Sottana, Grassini, Monturone, Oltre Grana, Palazzasso, Paschera San Carlo (Soprana), Paschera San Defendente (Sottana), Roata Bacias, Roata Borghi, Roata Bruno, Roata Chiabò, Roata Delfino, Roata Fresia, Roata Galliano, Roata Ghio, Roata Lorenzot, Roata Muschia, Rosata Armando, San Lorenzo, Tetto Bellino, Tetto Bianco, Tetto Boscasi.

Caraglio borders the following municipalities: Bernezzo, Busca, Cervasca, Cuneo, Dronero, Montemale di Cuneo, Valgrana.

== Demographic evolution ==
Historical population

Year	Pop.	±%
1861	6,728	—
1871	7,074	+5.1%
1881	6,937	−1.9%
1901	5,970	−13.9%
1911	5,333	−10.7%

Year	Pop.	±%
1921	5,592	+4.9%
1931	5,543	−0.9%
1936	5,535	−0.1%
1951	5,541	+0.1%
1961	5,097	−8.0%

Year	Pop.	±%
1971	5,203	+2.1%
1981	5,554	+6.7%
1991	5,721	+3.0%
2001	6,215	+8.6%

Source: Data from ISTAT

== Museums ==
- Silk Mill of Caraglio

== Notable people ==
- Arnaldo Momigliano, historian, born in Caraglio
- Rino Rossi

== Twin towns ==
Caraglio is twinned with:

- Laboulaye, Córdoba, Argentina
