= Pradleves =

- Comune
- Comune di Pradleves
- Location within Italy Location within Piedmont
- Coordinates: 44°25′N 7°17′E
- Country: Italy
- Region: Piedmont
- Province: Province of Cuneo (CN)

Area
  - Total: 19.2 km^{2} (7.4 sq mi)

Population (Dec. 2004)
  - Total: 306
  - Density: 15.9/km^{2} (41.3/sq mi)
- Time zone: UTC+1 (CET)
  - Summer (DST): UTC+2 (CEST)
- Postal code: 12027
- Dialing code: 0171

Pradleves is a comune (municipality) in the Province of Cuneo in the Italian region Piedmont, located about 80 kilometres (50 mi) southwest of Turin and about 20 kilometres (12 mi) west of Cuneo. As of 31 December 2004, it had a population of 306 and an area of 19.2 square kilometres (7.4 mi^{2}).

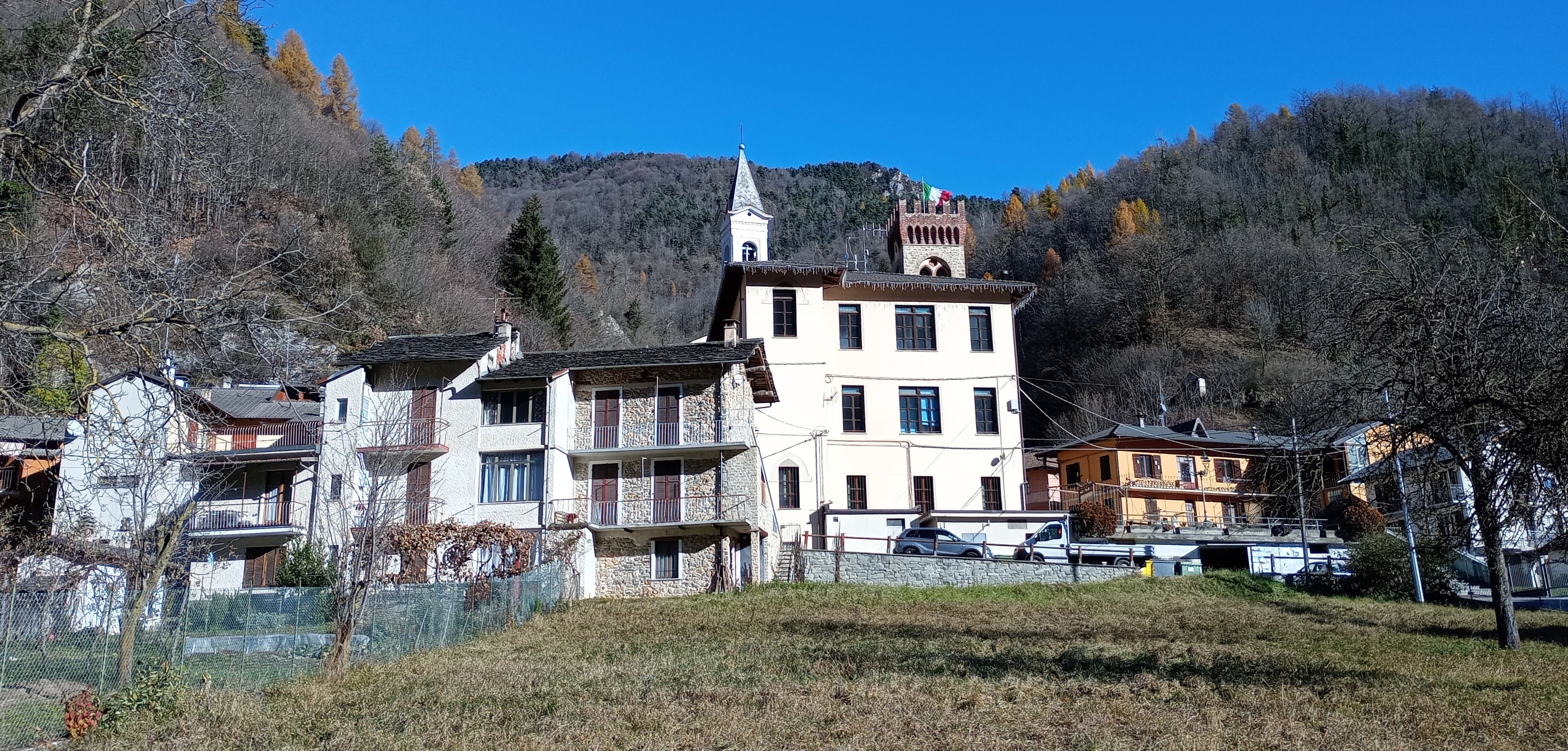

Pradleves borders the following municipalities: Castelmagno, Demonte, Dronero, and Monterosso Grana.

== Demographic evolution ==
Historical population

Year	Pop.	±%
1861	1,116	—
1871	1,181	+5.8%
1881	1,193	+1.0%
1901	1,113	−6.7%
1911	1,315	+18.1%

Year	Pop.	±%
1921	1,211	−7.9%
1931	1,000	−17.4%
1936	1,002	+0.2%
1951	804	−19.8%
1961	700	−12.9%

Year	Pop.	±%
1971	514	−26.6%
1981	422	−17.9%
1991	348	−17.5%
2001	317	−8.9%

Source: Data from ISTAT
