= Piasco =

- Comune
- Comune di Piasco
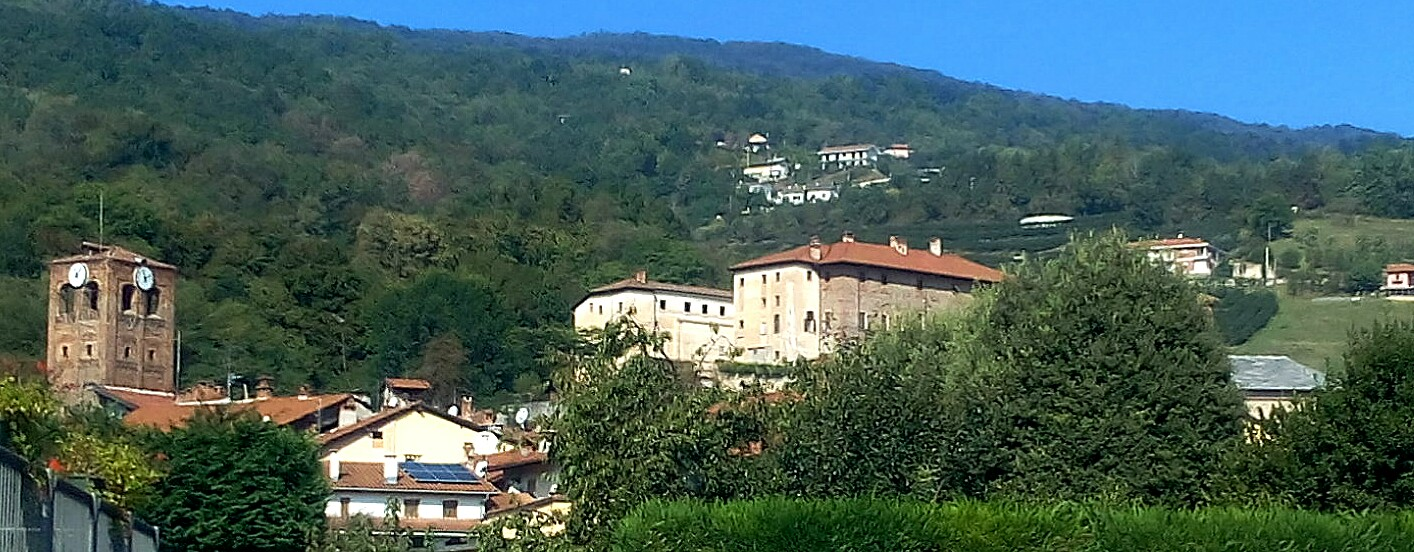

- Coat of arms

- Location within Italy Location within Piedmont
- Coordinates: 44°34′N 7°27′E
- Country: Italy
- Region: Piedmont
- Province: Cuneo (CN)
- Frazioni: Serravalle, Sant'Antonio

Government
  - Mayor: Roberto Ponte

Area
  - Total: 10.5 km^{2} (4.1 sq mi)
- Elevation: 458 m (1,503 ft)

Population (31 May 2007)
  - Total: 2,797
  - Density: 266/km^{2} (690/sq mi)
- Demonym: Piaschesi
- Time zone: UTC+1 (CET)
  - Summer (DST): UTC+2 (CEST)
- Postal code: 12026
- Dialing code: 0175
- Website: Official website

Piasco is a comune (municipality) in the Province of Cuneo in the Italian region Piedmont, located about 60 kilometres (37 mi) southwest of Turin and about 20 kilometres (12 mi) northwest of Cuneo.

It is home to the only museum of harps in the world.
