= Monterosso Grana =

- Comune
- Comune di Monterosso Grana
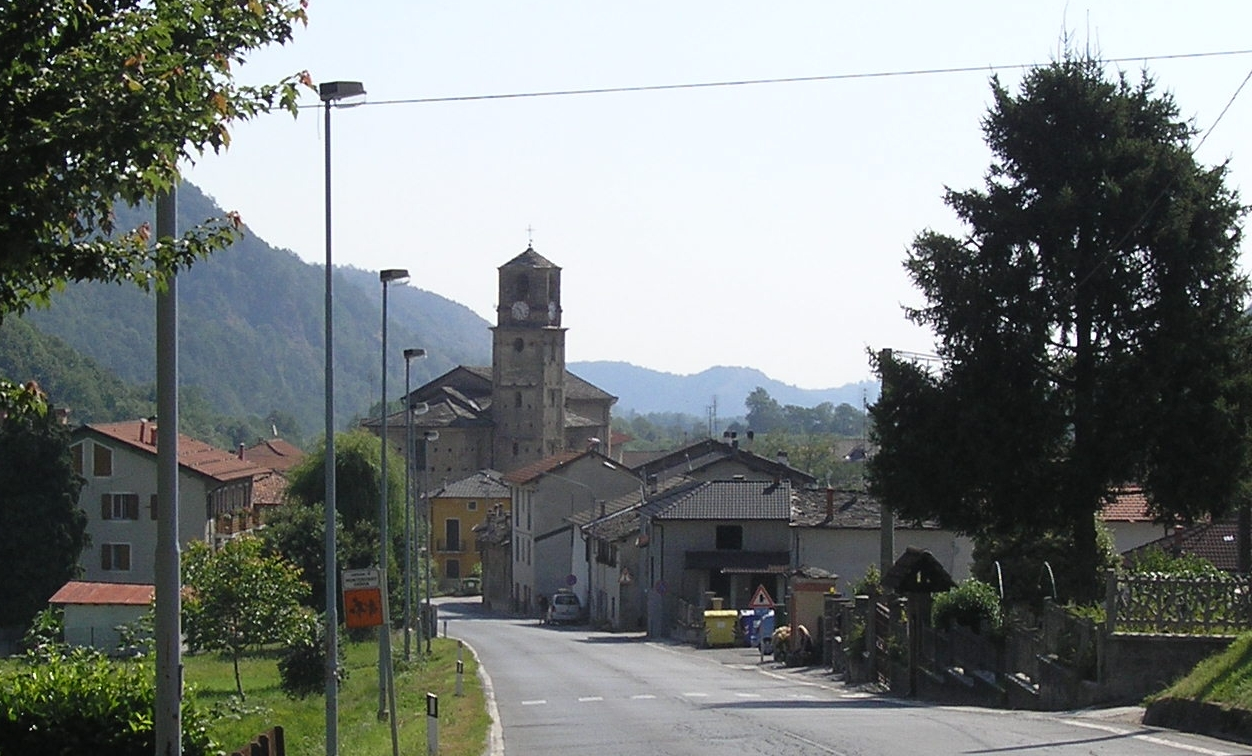

- Coat of arms

- Location within Italy Location within Piedmont
- Coordinates: 44°25′N 7°19′E
- Country: Italy
- Region: Piedmont
- Province: Cuneo (CN)
- Frazioni: Armandi Ollasca, Colletto, Comba, Endrio, Gallo, Partia, Quagna, Russa, Serredellamendia

Government
  - Mayor: Mauro Martini

Area
  - Total: 42.22 km^{2} (16.30 sq mi)
- Elevation: 720 m (2,360 ft)

Population (1-1-2018)
  - Total: 527
  - Density: 12.5/km^{2} (32.3/sq mi)
- Demonym: Monterossese(i)
- Time zone: UTC+1 (CET)
  - Summer (DST): UTC+2 (CEST)
- Postal code: 12020
- Dialing code: 0171
- Patron saint: St. James

Monterosso Grana is a comune (municipality) in the Province of Cuneo in the Italian region Piedmont, located about 80 kilometres (50 mi) southwest of Turin and about 20 kilometres (12 mi) west of Cuneo.

Monterosso Grana borders the following municipalities: Castelmagno, Demonte, Dronero, Montemale di Cuneo, Pradleves, Rittana, Valgrana, and Valloriate.
