= Revello =

- Comune
- Comune di Revello
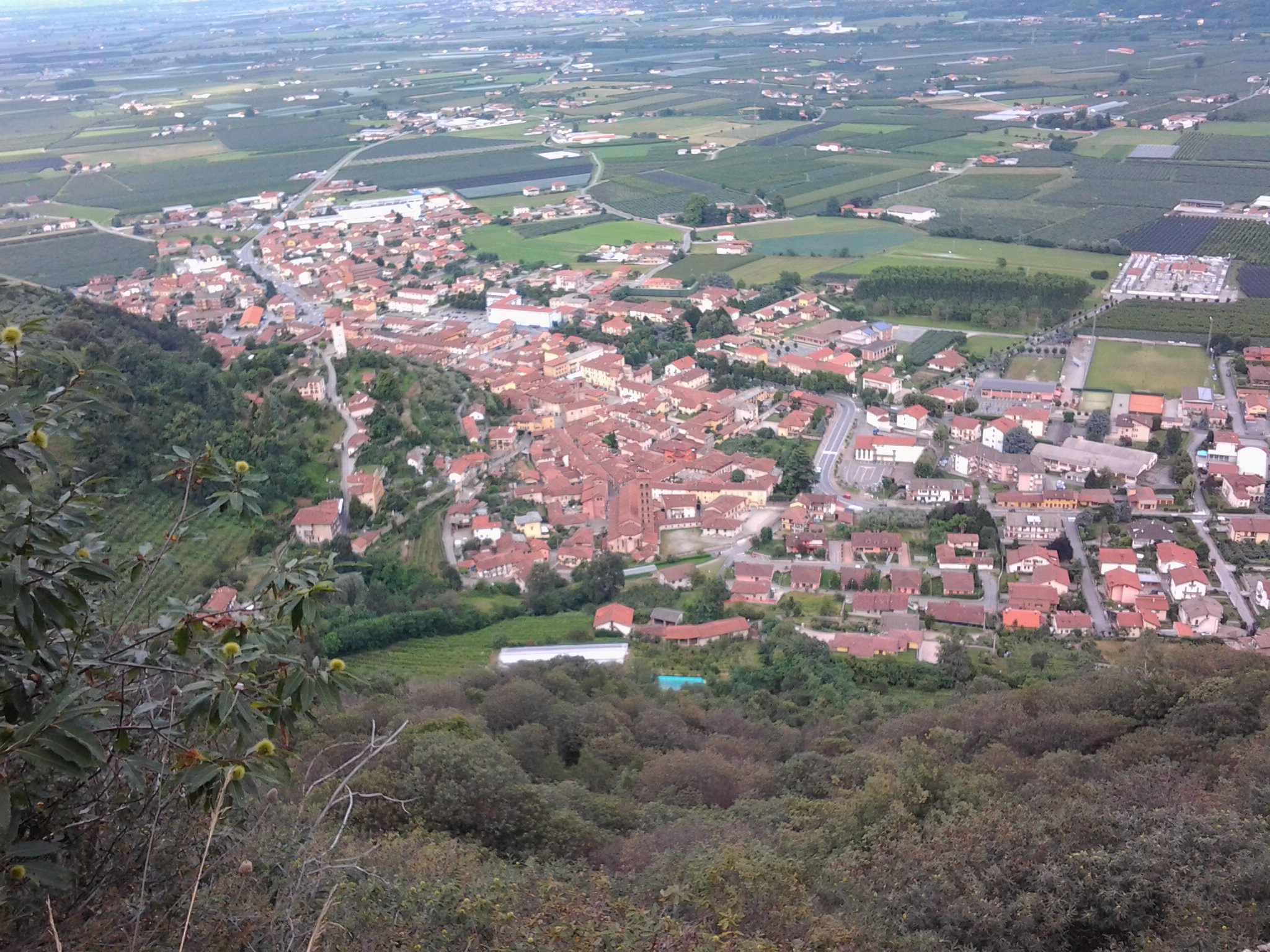
- View from Monte Bracco

- Coat of arms

- Location within Italy Location within Piedmont
- Coordinates: 44°39′N 7°23′E
- Country: Italy
- Region: Piedmont
- Province: Cuneo (CN)
- Frazioni: Campagnole, Morra San Martino, Madonna delle Grazie, San Firmino, San Pietro, Staffarda, Tetti Pertusio, Dietro Castello

Government
  - Mayor: Daniele Mattio

Area
  - Total: 53.5 km^{2} (20.7 sq mi)
- Elevation: 351 m (1,152 ft)

Population (31 May 2007)
  - Total: 4,226
  - Density: 79.0/km^{2} (205/sq mi)
- Demonym: Revellesi
- Time zone: UTC+1 (CET)
  - Summer (DST): UTC+2 (CEST)
- Postal code: 12036
- Dialing code: 0175
- Patron saint: St. Roch, St. Blaise
- Saint day: August 20, February 5
- Website: Official website

Revello (Arvel in Piedmontese, Revel in Occitan) is a comune (municipality) in the Province of Cuneo in the Italian region Piedmont, located about 50 kilometres (31 mi) southwest of Turin and about 30 kilometres (19 mi) northwest of Cuneo.

Revello borders the following municipalities: Barge, Brondello, Cardè, Envie, Gambasca, Martiniana Po, Pagno, Rifreddo, and Saluzzo. In the frazione of San Firmino, on the Po River, is the eponymous church, built over an ancient Roman temple (of which parts of two columns remain).

== History ==
Revello used to be a small city in the late middle ages of the former Marquisate of Saluzzo. It is found on a Courts register dating back to the tenth century. In this register it is called "Curtis Regia".

== People ==
- Carlo Giovanni Maria Denina (1731–1813) was an Italian historian

== Twin towns ==
Revello is twinned with:

- Pozo del Molle, Argentina
