= Castelmagno, Piedmont =

Castelmagno Chastèlmanh
- Comune
- Comune di Castelmagno
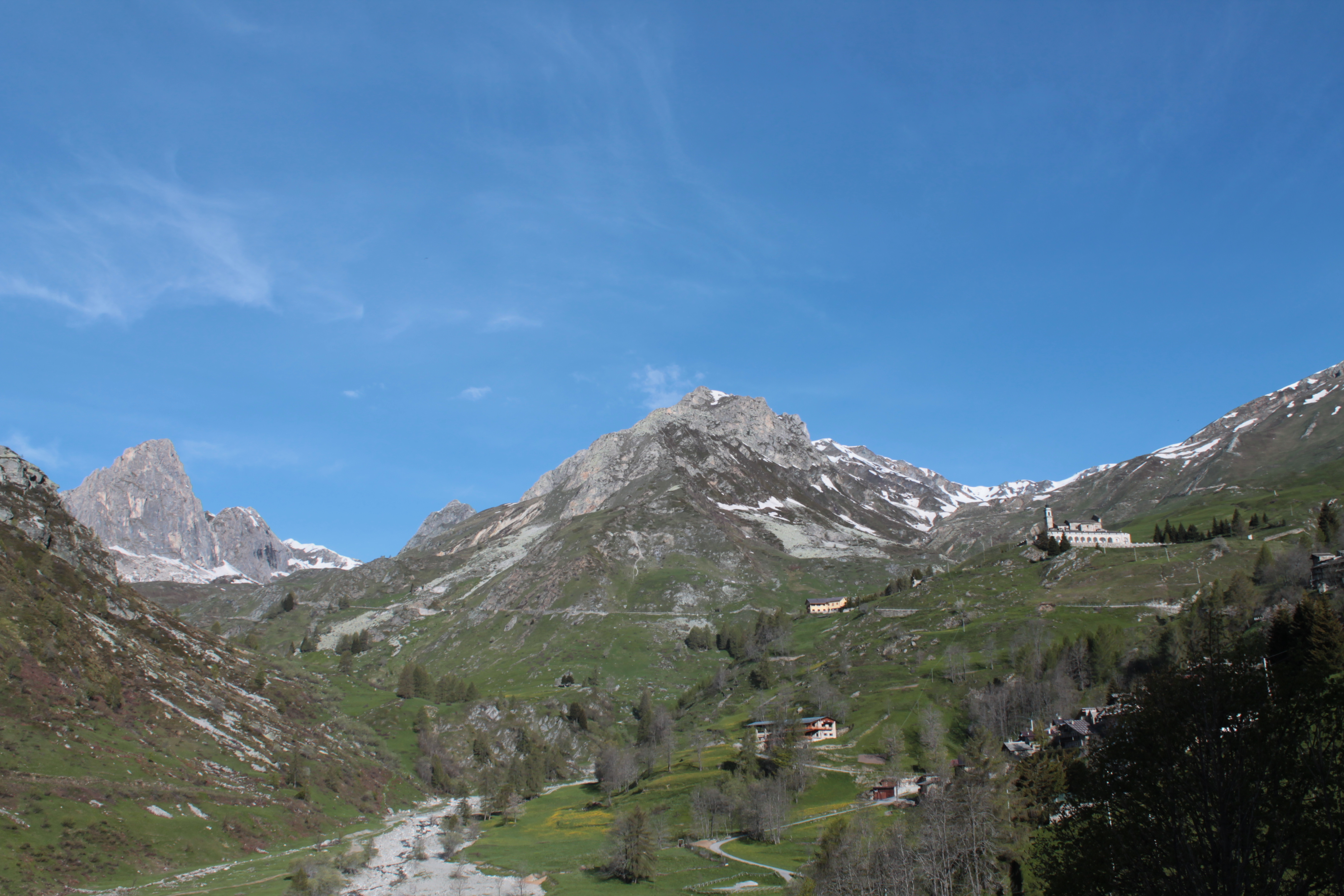
- Castelmagno: at right the Santuario di San Magno (Saint Magnus's sanctuary), on background at center the Reina peak and at his feet the Grana valley

- Coat of arms

- Location within Italy Location within Piedmont
- Coordinates: 44°25′N 7°13′E
- Country: Italy
- Region: Piedmont
- Province: Cuneo (CN)
- Frazioni: Campomolino, Chiappi, Chiotti, Colletto, Einaudi, Nerone

Government
  - Mayor: Maurizio Giaminardi

Area
  - Total: 48.8 km^{2} (18.8 sq mi)
- Elevation: 1,150 m (3,770 ft)

Population (31 August 2007)
  - Total: 95
  - Density: 1.9/km^{2} (5.0/sq mi)
- Demonym: Castelmagnesi
- Time zone: UTC+1 (CET)
  - Summer (DST): UTC+2 (CEST)
- Postal code: 12020
- Dialing code: 0171
- Patron saint: St. Magnus
- Saint day: August 19
- Website: Official website

Castelmagno (Occitan: Chastèlmanh) is a small comune (municipality) in the Province of Cuneo in the Italian region of Piedmont, located about 80 kilometres (50 mi) southwest of Turin and about 25 kilometres (16 mi) west of Cuneo.

The population of the municipality of Castelmagno is divided between the frazioni (hamlets) of Einaudi, Campomolino (seat of the city hall), Colletto, Nerone, Chiotti and Chiappi; "Castelmagno" is the name of the municipal entity, not corresponding to any hamlet. The main attraction is the sanctuary of San Magno, at an elevation of 1,761 metres (5,778 ft) above sea level.

Castelmagno borders the following municipalities: Celle di Macra, Demonte, Dronero, Marmora, Monterosso Grana, Pradleves, and San Damiano Macra.

== Demographic evolution ==
Historical population

Year	Pop.	±%
1861	1,310	—
1871	1,448	+10.5%
1881	1,431	−1.2%
1901	1,315	−8.1%
1911	1,210	−8.0%

Year	Pop.	±%
1921	1,062	−12.2%
1931	769	−27.6%
1936	698	−9.2%
1951	485	−30.5%
1961	294	−39.4%

Year	Pop.	±%
1971	186	−36.7%
1981	211	+13.4%
1991	163	−22.7%
2001	117	−28.2%

Source: Data from ISTAT

== Twin towns ==
Castelmagno is twinned with:

- Quittengo, Italy (1975)
