= Maira (river) =

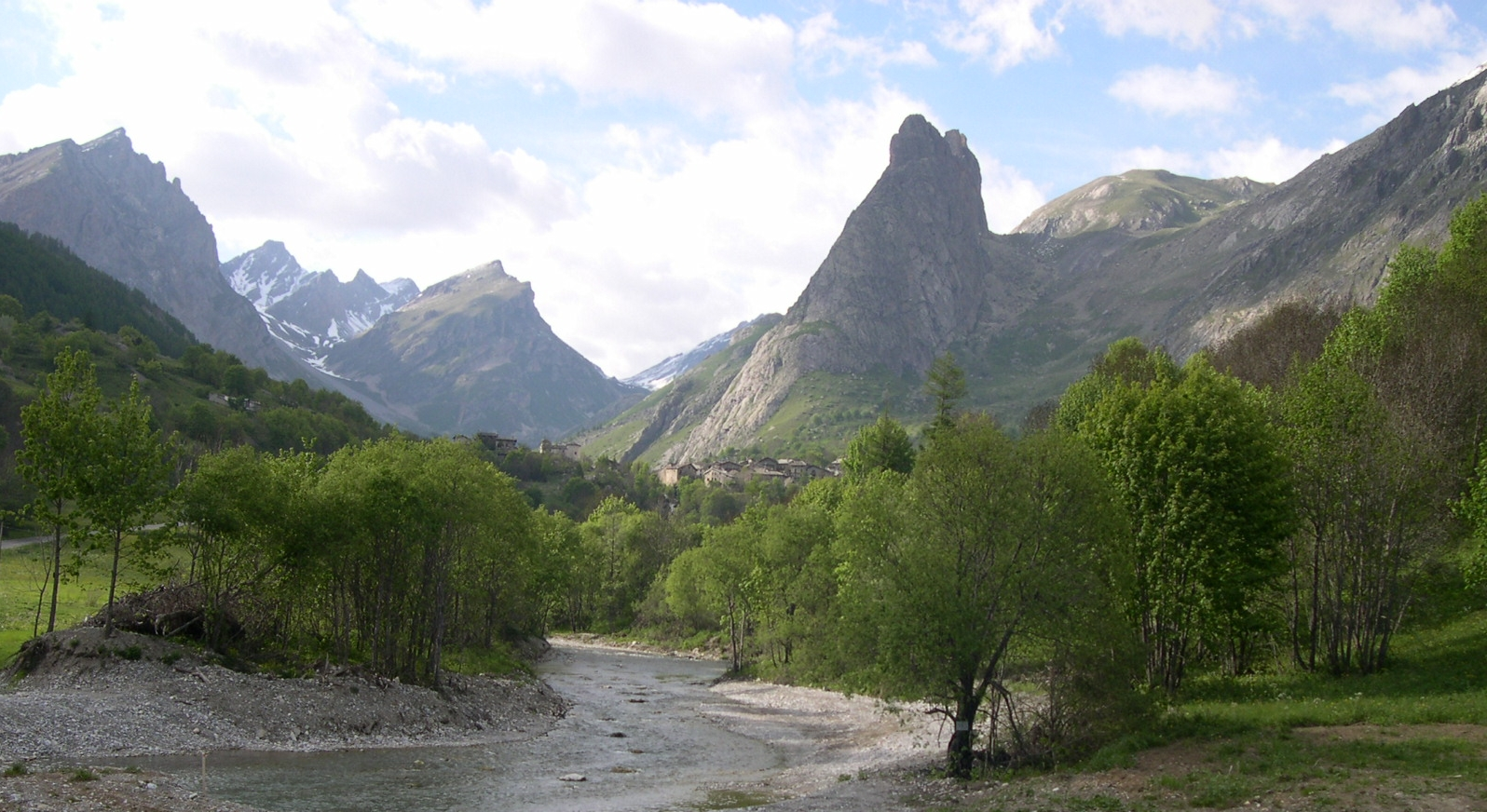
- The upper course of the river at Chiappera, a village between the source and Acceglio

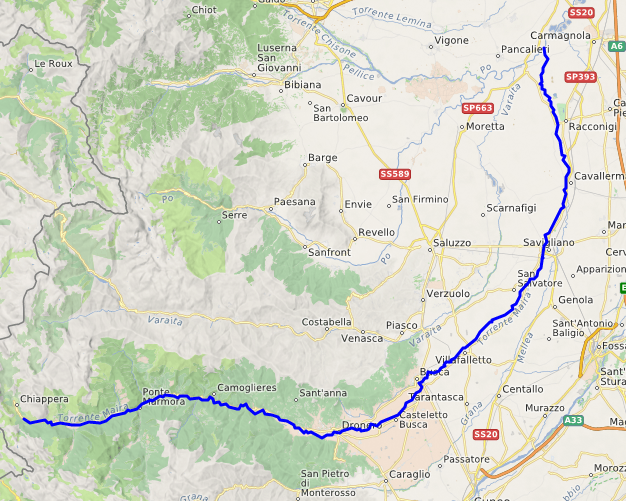

Location
- Country: Italy

Physical characteristics
- Source
  - location: Col de Mary in the upper Valle Maira
  - elevation: about 2,600 m (8,500 ft)
- Mouth
  - location: Po, near Lombriasco
  - coordinates: 44.8403°N 7.6500°E
- Length: 120 km (75 mi)
- Discharge
  - average: 19.5 m^{3}/s (690 cu ft/s)

Basin features
- Progression: Po→ Adriatic Sea

The Maira is an Italian river, a right tributary of the Po, which runs through the province of Cuneo in eastern Piedmont. Its source is in the Cottian Alps near the Col de Mary (or Col Maurin) on the French border. Its name, in the Occitan and Piedmontese languages, means ‘lean’ or ‘meagre’.

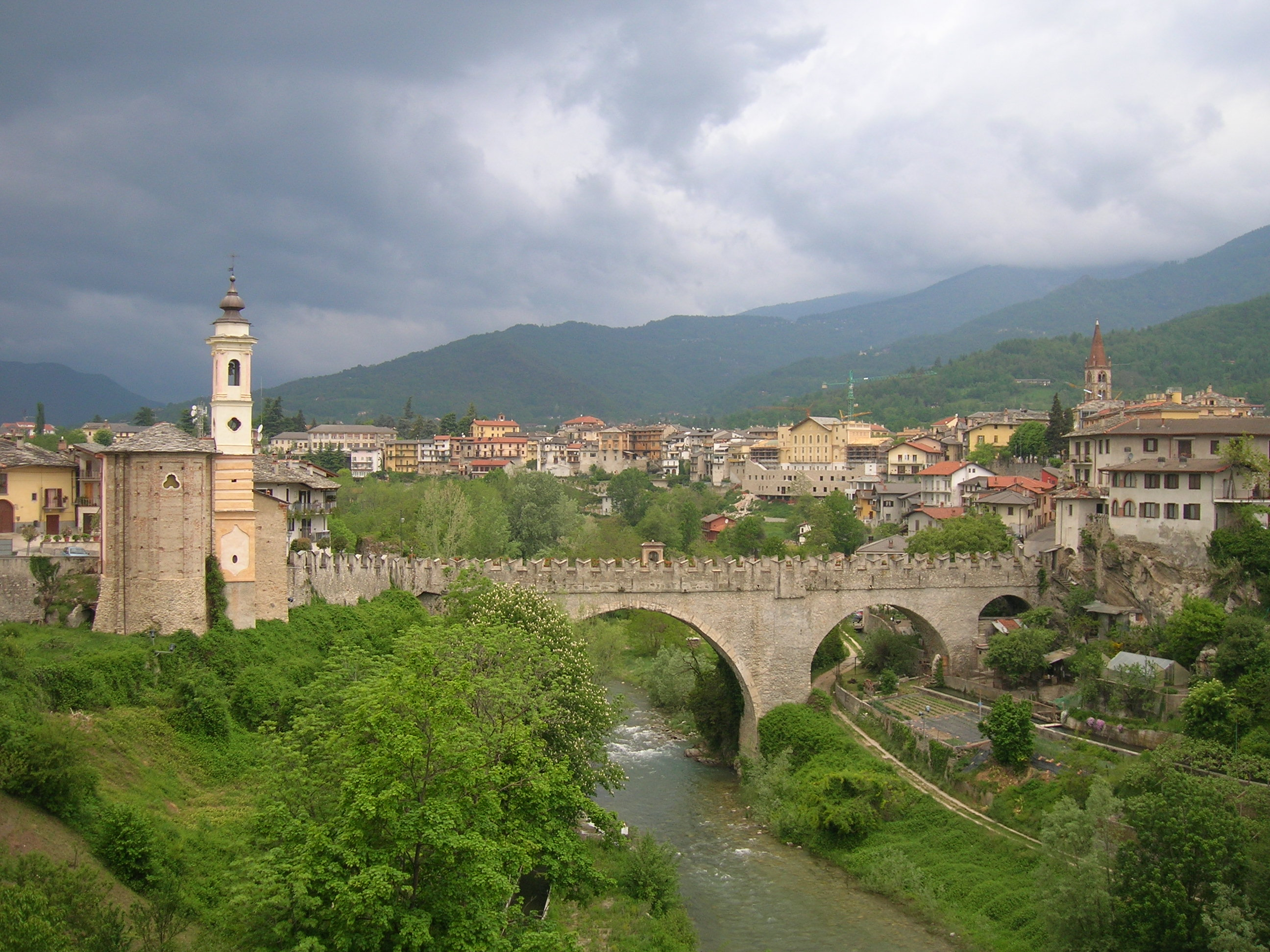
The ‘Devil’s bridge’ across the river at Dronero

During its upper course the river descends rapidly through the scenic Valle Maira, passing through the centres of Acceglio, Prazzo, Stroppo, Macra, San Damiano Macra, Cartignano and Dronero; at Busca it leaves the valley and enters the plains, continuing through Villafalletto and Vottignasco. It passes just to the left of Savigliano, while the Grana-Mellea, its main tributary, passes to the right of the town: they continue in parallel before joining near Cavallermaggiore.

The next town the river meets is Racconigi, where it follows the edge of the park of the Royal Castle of Racconigi, the celebrated summer residence of the House of Savoy. Finally the river enters briefly into the territory of the Province of Turin before joining the Po from the right within the municipal bounds of the Comune of Lombriasco.

The Maira’s regime is typical of an Alpine torrent: full flowing in the spring, and tending to dry up in the summer months. Over a typical year its mean discharge is equal to 19.5 cubic metres per second (690 cu ft/s).

During Roman times, the river was known as the Macra.
