= Valmala, Piedmont =

Valmala
- Frazione
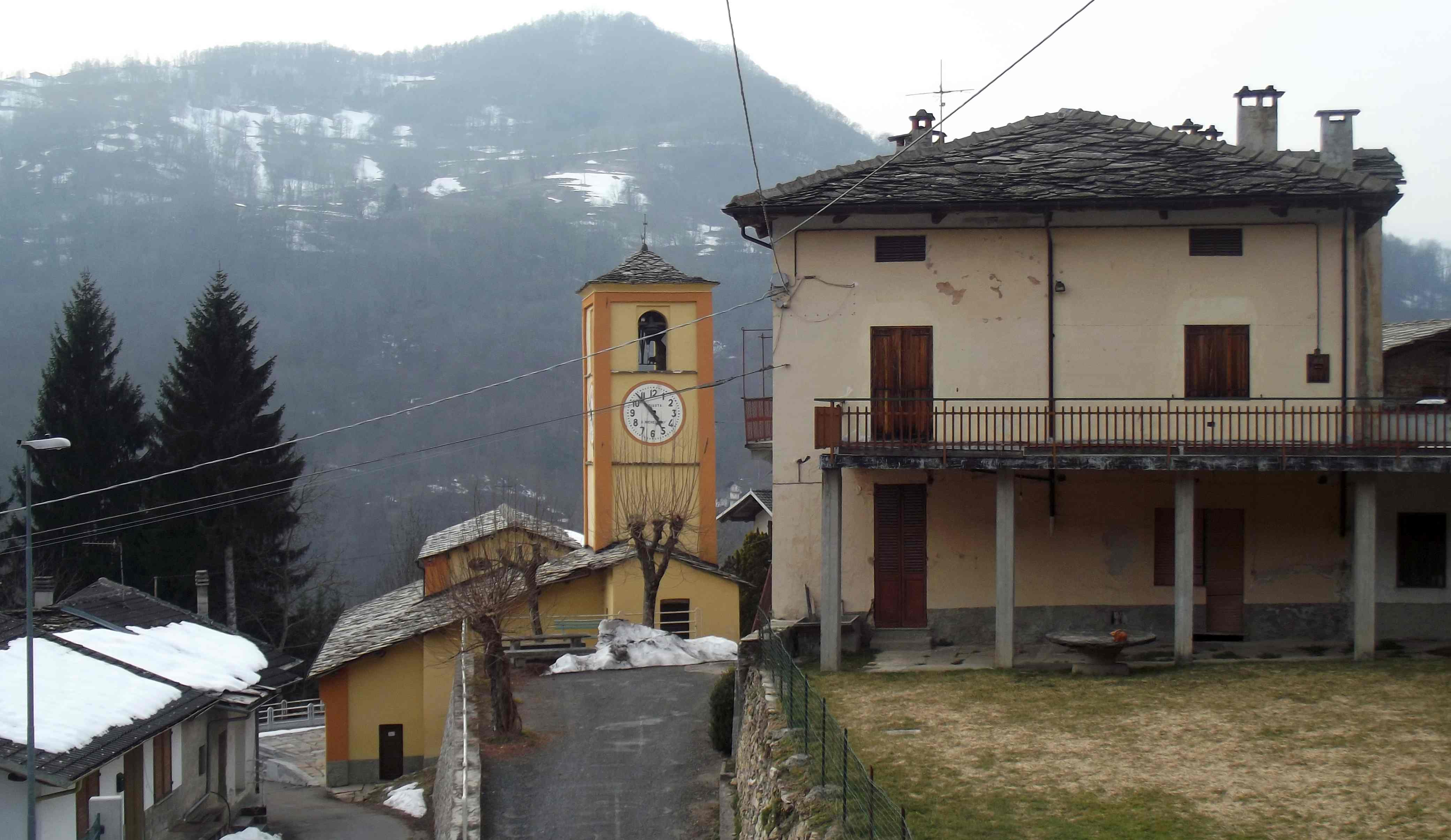
- Winter view

- Location of Valmala in Italy
- Coordinates: 44°33′N 7°21′E
- Country: Italy
- Region: Piedmont
- Province: Cuneo (CN)
- Comune: Busca

Population (Dec. 2004)
  - Total: 61
- Time zone: UTC+1 (CET)
  - Summer (DST): UTC+2 (CEST)
- Postal code: 12020
- Dialing code: 0175

Valmala was a comune (municipality) in the Province of Cuneo in the Italian region Piedmont, located about 60 kilometres (37 mi) southwest of Turin and about 25 kilometres (16 mi) northwest of Cuneo. As of 31 December 2004, it had a population of 61 and an area of 11.0 square kilometres (4.2 mi^{2}).

== History ==
Valmala was an autonomous comune up to the end of 2018; on 1 January 2019 it was united with the neighbouring comune of Busca, thus enforcing the results of a referendum held in the summer of 2018.

As a self-standing comune Valmala bordered the following municipalities: Brossasco, Busca, Melle, Roccabruna, Rossana, Venasca, and Villar San Costanzo.

== Demographic evolution ==
Historical population

Year	Pop.	±%
1861	732	—
1871	826	+12.8%
1881	823	−0.4%
1901	805	−2.2%
1911	682	−15.3%

Year	Pop.	±%
1921	581	−14.8%
1931	493	−15.1%
1936	455	−7.7%
1951	360	−20.9%
1961	284	−21.1%

Year	Pop.	±%
1971	175	−38.4%
1981	95	−45.7%
1991	70	−26.3%
2001	56	−20.0%

Source: Data from ISTAT
