= Pagliero =

Pagliero (Italian pronunciation: [paʎˈʎɛːro]) may refer to:

== Places ==
- Pagliero, Cuneo, a village in the province of Cuneo, Italy

== People ==
- Leonard Pagliero (1913–2008), British stationer and chairman of The Kennel Club
- Ludmila Pagliero (born 1983), Argentine ballet dancer
- Marcello Pagliero (1907–1980), Italian film director

== See also ==
- Pagliaro
- Paglieri
