= Pagliari =

Pagliari (pronounced [paʎˈʎaːri]) is an Italian surname, originally denoting someone working with straw (Italian: paglia). Notable people with the surname include:

- Dino Pagliari (born 1957), Italian footballer and manager
- Giovanni Pagliari, member of Italian band Ataraxia
- Giovanni Battista Pagliari (1741–1816), Italian painter and art restorer
- Renato Pagliari (1940–2009), Italian singer
- Rubén Pagliari (1927–1987), Argentine basketball player
- Victor Pagliari Giro (born 1994), Brazilian footballer

== See also ==
- Pagliaro
- Paglieri
