= Costanzo Benedetto Bonvicino =

Italian chemist

Constanzo Benedetto Bonvicino, (Latinized as Constantius Benedictus Bonvicinus, and also known as Bonvoisin) (1739 – 25 January 1812) was an Italian chemist.

Bonvicino was born in Centallo in a wealthy family and was educated in medicine and chemistry at the University of Turin (1765) after which he became a professor of natural history and pharmaceutical chemistry in 1800. He took an interest in mineralogy, studying opals, and in a range of chemical studies including analyses of water, fungal toxins, methods to detect iron. He was also among the early Italian chemists to criticize the phlogiston theory.
