= Valmala =

Valmala may refer to:

- Valmala, Italy, a former comune (municipality) in the Province of Cuneo in the Italian region Piedmont
- Valmala, Province of Burgos, a municipality located in Castile and León, Spain.
