= Costigliole Saluzzo =

- Comune
- Comune di Costigliole Saluzzo
- Location within Italy Location within Piedmont
- Coordinates: 44°34′N 7°29′E
- Country: Italy
- Region: Piedmont
- Province: Province of Cuneo (CN)

Area
  - Total: 15.3 km^{2} (5.9 sq mi)

Population (Dec. 2004)
  - Total: 3,212
  - Density: 210/km^{2} (544/sq mi)
- Time zone: UTC+1 (CET)
  - Summer (DST): UTC+2 (CEST)
- Postal code: 12024
- Dialing code: 0175

Costigliole Saluzzo is a comune (municipality) in the Province of Cuneo in the Italian region Piedmont, located about 60 km (37 mi) southwest of Turin and about 20 km (12 mi) north of Cuneo. As of 31 December 2004, it had a population of 3,212 and an area of 15.3 km^{2} (5.9 sq mi).

Costigliole Saluzzo borders the following municipalities: Busca, Piasco, Rossana, Verzuolo, and Villafalletto.

== Demographic evolution ==
Historical population

Year	Pop.	±%
1861	2,654	—
1871	2,821	+6.3%
1881	2,735	−3.0%
1901	2,633	−3.7%
1911	2,644	+0.4%

Year	Pop.	±%
1921	2,750	+4.0%
1931	2,678	−2.6%
1936	2,790	+4.2%
1951	2,903	+4.1%
1961	2,818	−2.9%

Year	Pop.	±%
1971	2,941	+4.4%
1981	3,211	+9.2%
1991	3,097	−3.6%
2001	3,122	+0.8%

Source: Data from ISTAT

== Twin towns ==
Costigliole Saluzzo is twinned with:

- Banon, Alpes-de-Haute-Provence, France
- Beaumont-lès-Valence, France
- Oriolo, Italy
