= Bartholomew Dardanelli =

Italian diplomat and entrepreneur (1830–1869)

- Bartolomeo Dardanelli

Consul of Italy in Melbourne
- In office 1860–1861

Personal details
- Born: 1830 Centallo, Kingdom of Sardinia
- Died: May 5, 1869 (aged 38–39) Melbourne, Australia
- Spouse: Mary King
- Children: Vittorina Martalina Dardanelli; Bartholomew G. Dardanelli
- Parent(s): Giuseppe Dardanelli; Maria Vivalda
- Occupation: Diplomat and entrepreneur
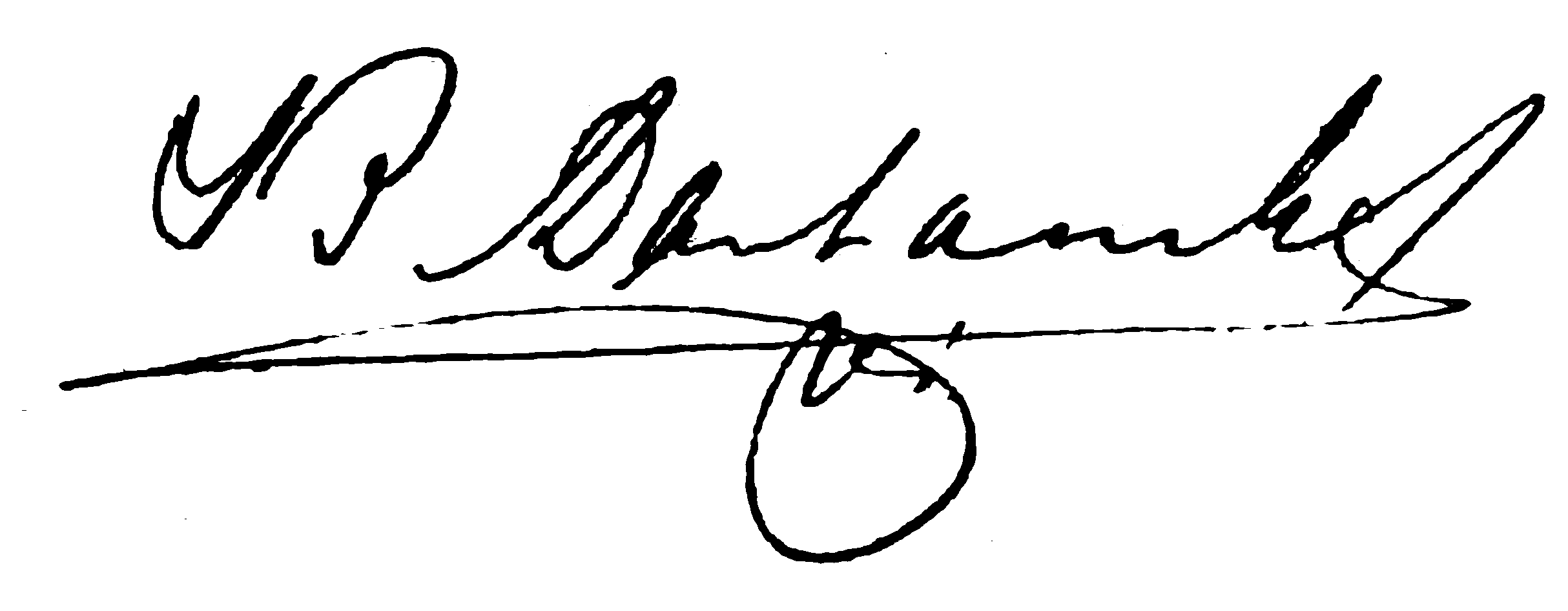
- Signature

Bartholomew Dardanelli (1830 – 5 May 1869), also known as Bartolomeo Dardanelli, was an Italian diplomat and entrepreneur. Based in Australia, he served as the Consul and Vice-Consul of the Kingdom of Sardinia in Melbourne. He was active in the Italian community of colonial Victoria and is known for his involvement supporting Italian Independence and his relationship with Giuseppe Garibaldi.

After settling in Melbourne in 1855, Dardanelli engaged in trade and introduced the silk industry to the continent. His public advocacy for the Risorgimento and his fundraising campaigns for Italian independence led to a correspondence with Giuseppe Garibaldi, who publicly thanked Dardanelli for his services.

== Biography ==
=== Early life and family ===
Bartholomew Dardanelli, originally named Bartolomeo, was born in 1830 in Centallo, Cuneo, to Giuseppe Dardanelli and Maria Vivalda, both descendants of old families from the Monregalese region. His parents had only recently arrived in the area; Bartholomew's older brother, Francesco Dardanelli, had been born in nearby Roccaforte in 1826.

The Dardanelli family belonged to the local nobility, having settled in Breolungi and Mondovi since at least the 16th century, where they owned the Palazzo Dardanelli and held the patronage of the Fusenta Chapel. The Vivaldi (or Vivalda) family was also prominent among the local patriciate, with their arms recorded in the Collezione di armi gentilizie di Mondovì.

Bartholomew's brother, Francesco Dardanelli, pursued a military career, eventually reaching the rank of colonel. He distinguished himself during the Italian Wars of Independence and the Siege of Gaeta, and was later appointed by King Victor Emmanuel II as first commander of the Royal Cuirassiers (Corazzieri Reali).

=== Establishment in Australia ===
Driven by the opportunities of the Australian gold rush and the region's expanding commercial landscape, Dardanelli migrated to Melbourne, where he was first mentioned in government and commercial notices in January 1855. Months later, he began publishing commercial advertisements for "B. Dardanelli and CO., Brokers and Commission Agents", located at 121 Flinders Street West.

Upon his arrival in Melbourne, Dardanelli quickly became a public advocate for the Kingdom of Sardinia and the local Italian diaspora. In 1855, he published a letter in The Argus responding to a piece by John Pascoe Fawkner. In it, he highlighted the contributions of Italian troops on the Crimean front:

If to their merit in military enterprise, we add the position in which Piedmont stands [...], only a small kingdom, a fortieth part of the British Empire, giving a contingent equal to a fourth of the entire British army in the Crimea, it is evident that she has made one of the noblest and most generous sacrifices on her part, and deserves the highest consideration, as her army is required at home to act against Austria in a more holy cause, the Independence of Italy [...].

Over time, Dardanelli's social standing in Melbourne grew. By 1858, a resident writing to The Age noted that they had gathered certain facts from gentlemen of undoubted honor, adding, I need only to mention the name of Mr. Dardanelli, as a guarantee.

=== Diplomatic activity ===
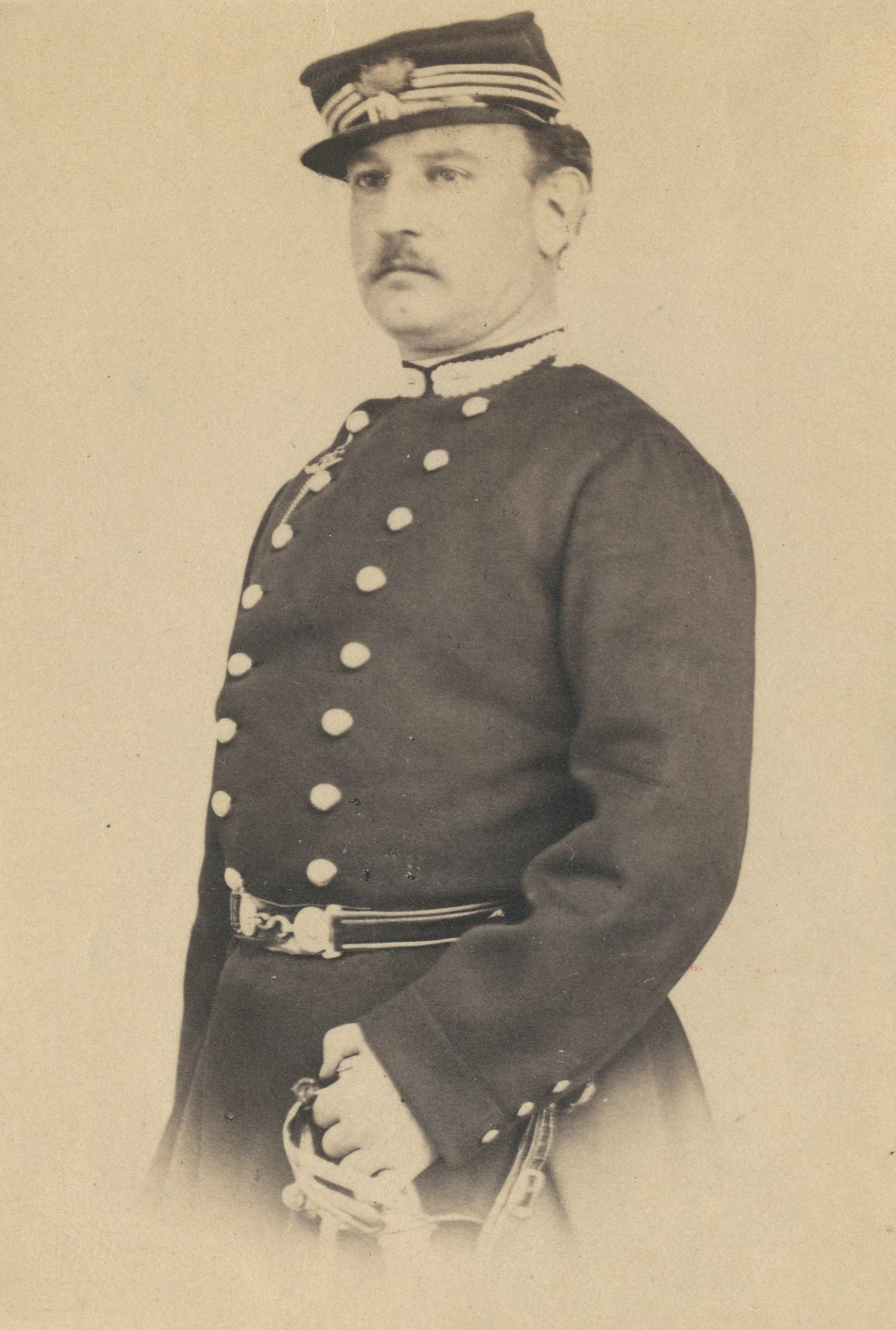
Col. Francesco Dardanelli, brother of Bartholomew

Dardanelli gradually became a key leadership figure within the nascent Italian community in Victoria.In 1858, during a meeting of patriots at Melbourne to honour the republicans Felice Orsini and Giuseppe Pierri following their assassination attempt against Napoleon III, Dardanelli delivered an acclaimed speech, which concluded by calling upon all patriots to be true to Italy and freedom.

Following the outbreak of the Second Italian War of Independence, a committee was formed on 12 July 1859 to raise subscriptions to support the destitute families of Italian soldiers fighting on the battlefield. Dardanelli was elected to the committee alongside G. Corradini and A. Martelli. In August of that year, during a joint patriotic meeting of Italian and French residents at Melbourne's Café des Étrangers, Dardanelli proposed a toast to the constant alliance of England, France and Sardinia.

In 1860, King Victor Emmanuel II recognised Dardanelli's efforts by appointing him a diplomatic representative of the Kingdom of Sardinia in Melbourne. Diplomatic records from the Ministry of Foreign Affairs dating between 5 January and 17 February 1860 list Dardanelli as Consul in the city. On 7 August 1860, he attended an official presentation before Henry Barkly, the Governor of Victoria, in his capacity of Sardinian Vice-Consul. The Melbourne-based consulate had responsibility for Victoria, South Australia, Tasmania and later New Zealand.

=== Relationship with Giuseppe Garibaldi ===
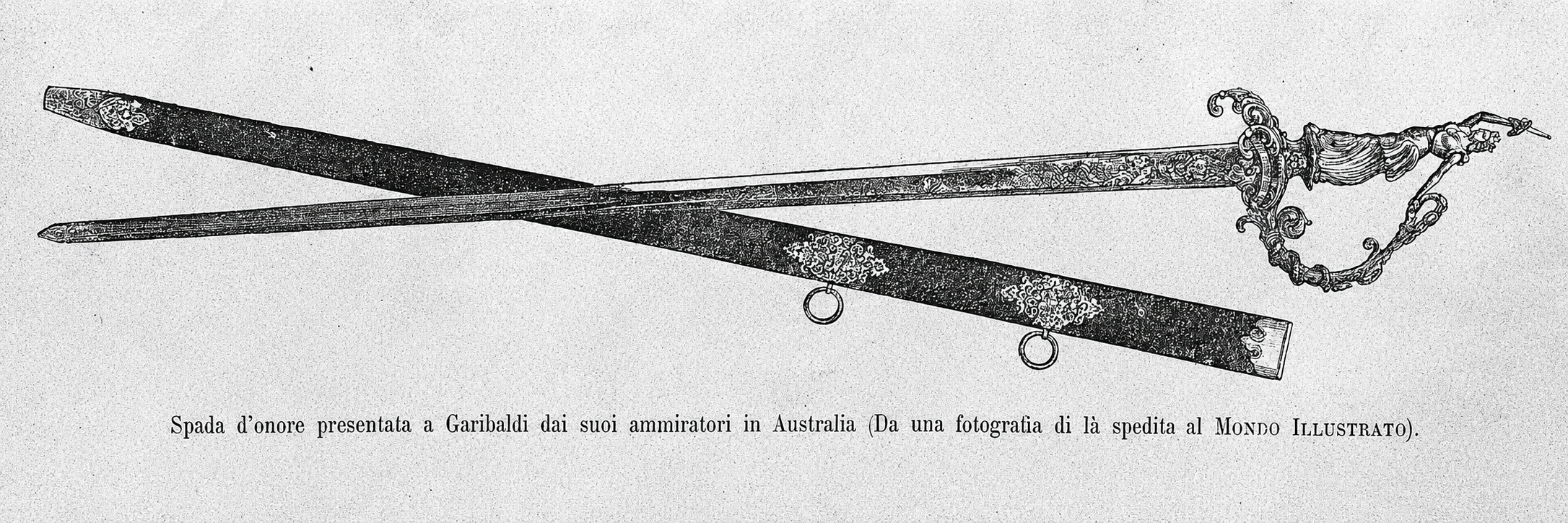
Sword gifted to Garibaldi

Because of his active support for the Risorgimento and his leadership within the Melbourne Italian community, Dardanelli interacted with Giuseppe Garibaldi on two notable occasions: first, by organising the presentation of a ceremonial sword funded by Italian residents in Australia; and second, through a public press debate for which Garibaldi personally thanked him.

==== Presentation of the Sword of Honour ====
On 20 August 1860, a meeting of General Garibaldi's admirers was held at the Mechanics' Institute in Melbourne, chaired by Dardanelli. The attendees resolved to launch a subscription fund to purchase a "Sword of Honour" for the Risorgimento leader. Dardanelli praised Garibaldi as one of the greatest men of the present day, stating that he might fairly be compared to Washington and William Tell.

The campaign, managed by the Garibaldi Testimonial Committee with Dardanelli serving as honorary secretary, culminated in commissioning Chevalier to design a sword of pure Australian gold, with mouldings emblematical of Enfranchised Italy. The sword was forged by the jeweler Eicke, and it featured a female figure personifying Liberty on the hilt and was encrusted with numerous precious gems, reaching a total value of £358, a considerable sum at the time.

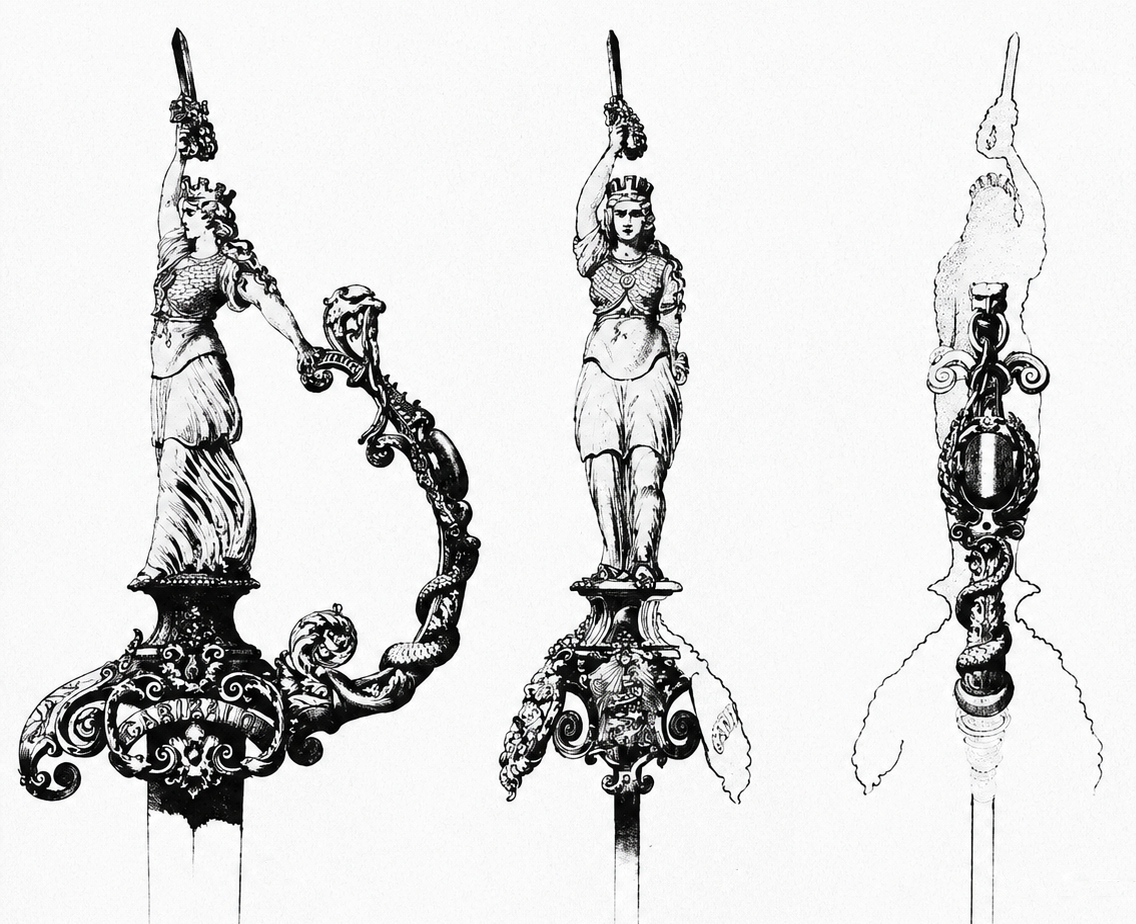
Detail of the golden sword

Dardanelli, alongside James Smith and A. Martelli, dispatched the gift to General Garibaldi with a letter dated 25 May 1861, signed by your admirers in Australia. Garibaldi replied from Caprera on 19 August 1861:

Gentlemen, In offering me a sword during so dishonorable an armistice, you seem to recall to recollection that heroic epoch in which a troop of cavaliers armed for warfare the champion of an oppressed people. Thanks for the precious gift! Thanks for the signification which I read upon it (amor patriae) [...]. Ever most affectionately yours, G. Garibaldi.

==== Controversy with Father Bleasdale ====
Shortly after the delivery of the golden sword, Garibaldi and the Australian committee came under sharp criticism from John Bleasdale, an influential English Catholic priest based in Victoria. In a note sent to The Tablet, Bleasdale called Garibaldi an Italian rebel, who ought to have been hanged long ago, and accused Dardanelli, Smith and Martelli of failing to secure a significant number of subscriptions, leaving them in debt for the sword's manufacture.

Dardanelli published an open letter in response on 27 November 1861, defending the general by stating that the acts of Garibaldi can better be judged by appealing to all enlightened Europe, and I might say to the whole world, than by the opinions of the Rev. John Bleasdale and his clique.

Regarding the fundraising, Dardanelli clarified that the committee included four members of the Upper House, three members of the Lower House, prominent bankers, merchants, and over 1,500 individual subscribers.

Garibaldi subsequently wrote back to Dardanelli on 26 February 1862 from Caprera to address the criticism and express his gratitude:

Dear Dardanelli, Whenever priests mix themselves up in temporal or civil matters, society is sure to suffer. Bad priests penetrate, it seems, even to the remotest regions of the world. I affectionately salute the generous population of Australia. Always yours, G. Garibaldi.

=== Commercial activities ===
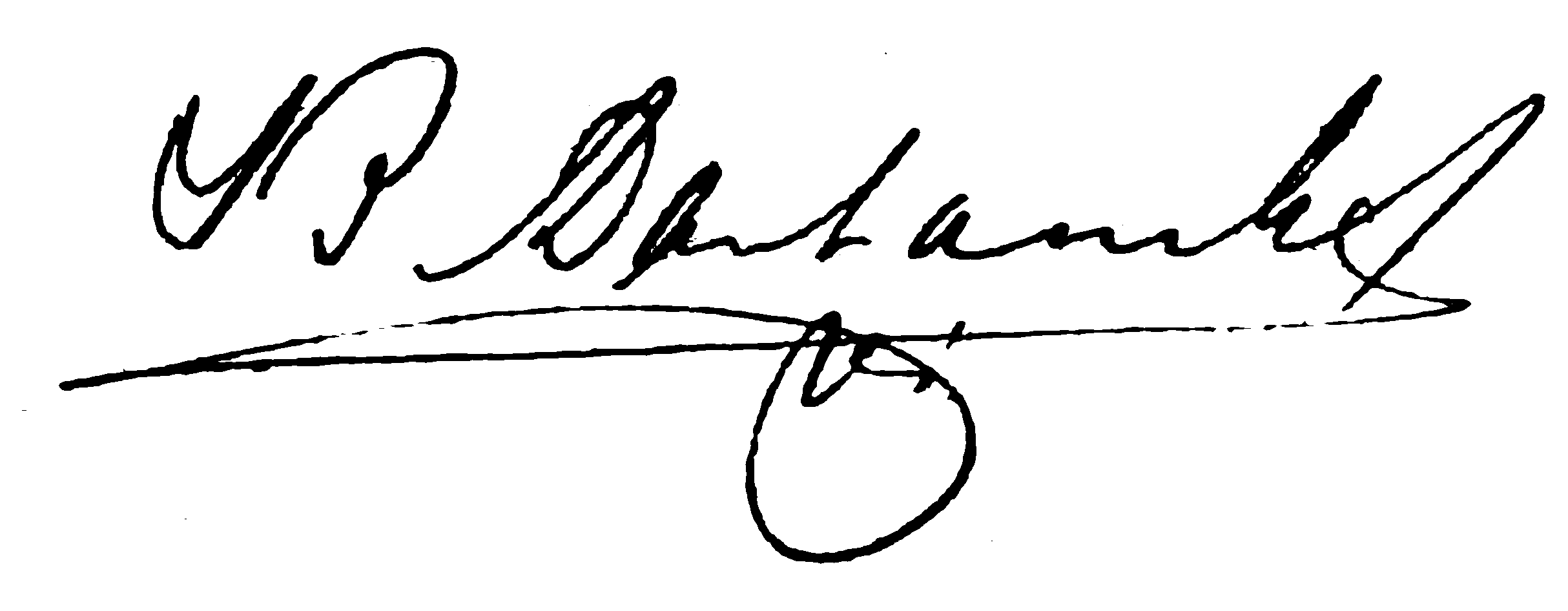
Signature of Bartholomew Dardanelli

Bartholomew Dardanelli's primary occupation was commerce. Following a declaration of insolvency in July 1861, when his liabilities amounted to £1,861, his financial situation stabilised after he introduced sericulture to the Australian market.

Dardanelli actively promoted the local production of silk using cocoons harvested from silkworm eggs imported from Italy. He presented a comprehensive report on the viability of sericulture at the 1862 Victoria Exhibition, displaying five distinct categories of processed silk samples to demonstrate that Australian-grown silk could compete with French and Italian markets. Local press reports noted that his samples were full of promise for the future of this branch of industry.

=== Reception of the frigate Magenta ===
In May 1867, the Italian Royal Navy corvette Magenta, commanded by Rear Admiral Vittorio Arminjon during its circumnavigation of the globe, arrived in Melbourne. On 23 May, a local delegation led by Dardanelli boarded the vessel. Dardanelli presented Arminjon with a letter signed by 164 Italian residents of Victoria, expressing their pride at the sight in this port of their national flag on the ship commanded by you, and praising the Magenta's scientific mission.

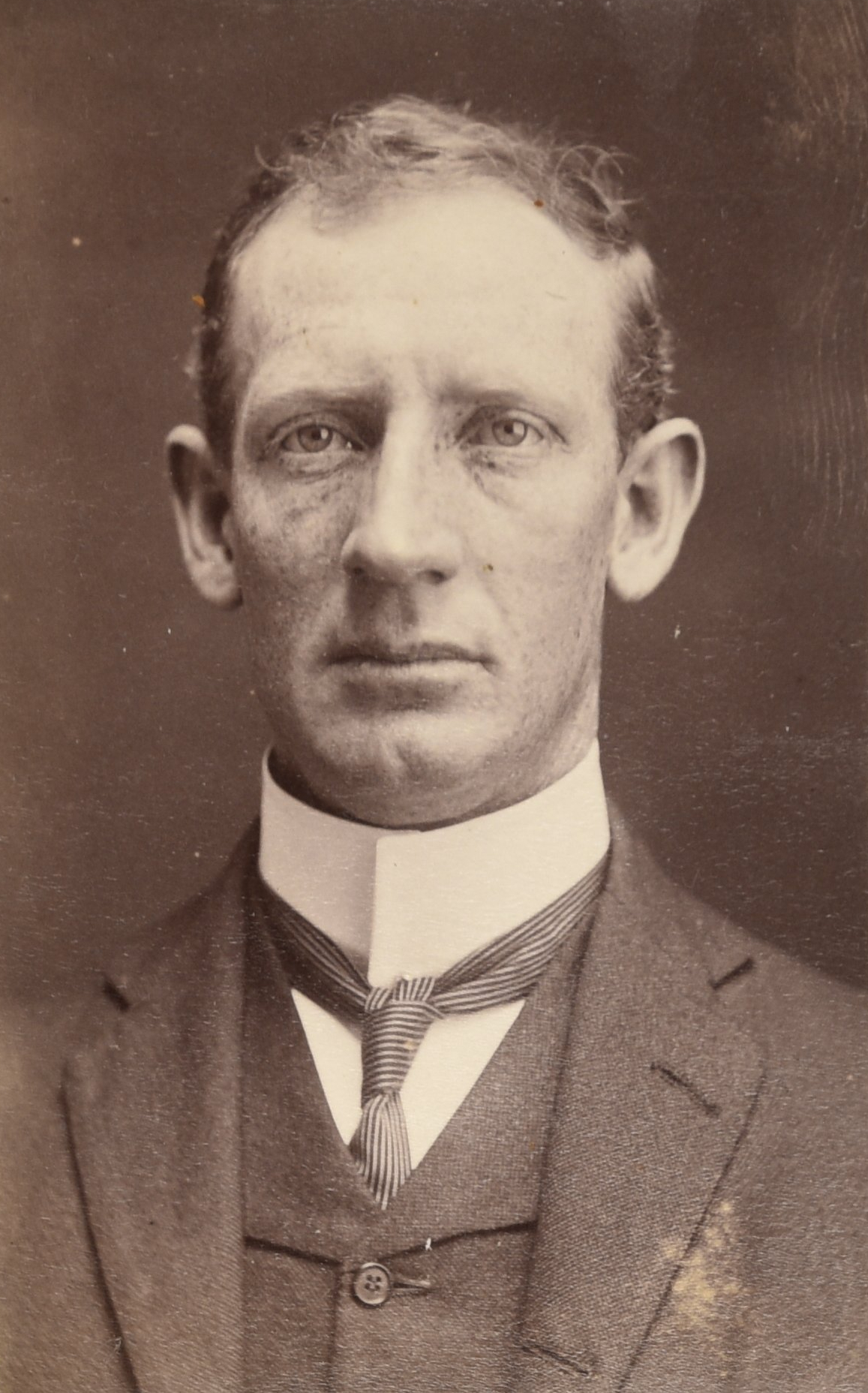
Bartholomew Giovanni, son of B. Dardanelli

The crew of the Magenta noted the size of the Italian community in Victoria and their sense of internal solidarity. Arminjon replied to Dardanelli's letter, promising that the voice of the first Italians who came here to create for their countrymen a new spring of richness, will be listened to at home.

=== Later years and death ===
Following the visit of the Magenta, Bartholomew Dardanelli's mental health declined rapidly. By 1868, he was diagnosed with dementia and was admitted to the Melbourne Asylum. At the request of Dardanelli's wife, the Italian Consul Giuseppe Biagi sent a report to the Italian Ministry of Foreign Affairs on 9 November 1868 to locate his brother, Colonel Francesco Dardanelli, and apprise him of the situation.

Dardanelli died in Melbourne on 5 May 1869 at the age of 38. He was buried at Melbourne General Cemetery. An obituary published the following day stated:

On the 5th inst., of disease of the brain and lungs, B. Dardanelli, late of Rosemount, Brighton, in the thirty-eight year of his age, for several years Consul for His Majesty the King of Italy, and brother to Cavalier Dardanelli, commander of the King's private guard. New Zealand and Adelaide papers please copy.

=== Marriage and descendants ===
Dardanelli married Mary King, an Australian national. The couple resided in Melbourne and had at least two children: 1) Vittorina Martalina Dardanelli, later known as Lena Russell following her marriage to Thomas Russell, who left descendants; 2) Bartholomew Giovanni Dardanelli, who followed his father into commerce, and married English actress Sarah Agnes Morrison, and later married Norah Skeffington Carroll, a prominent Australian writer.
