= Roccolo Castle =

Castle in the Italian town of Busca, Piedmont

Coordinates: 44°31′46″N 7°28′06″E

- Busca in Italy
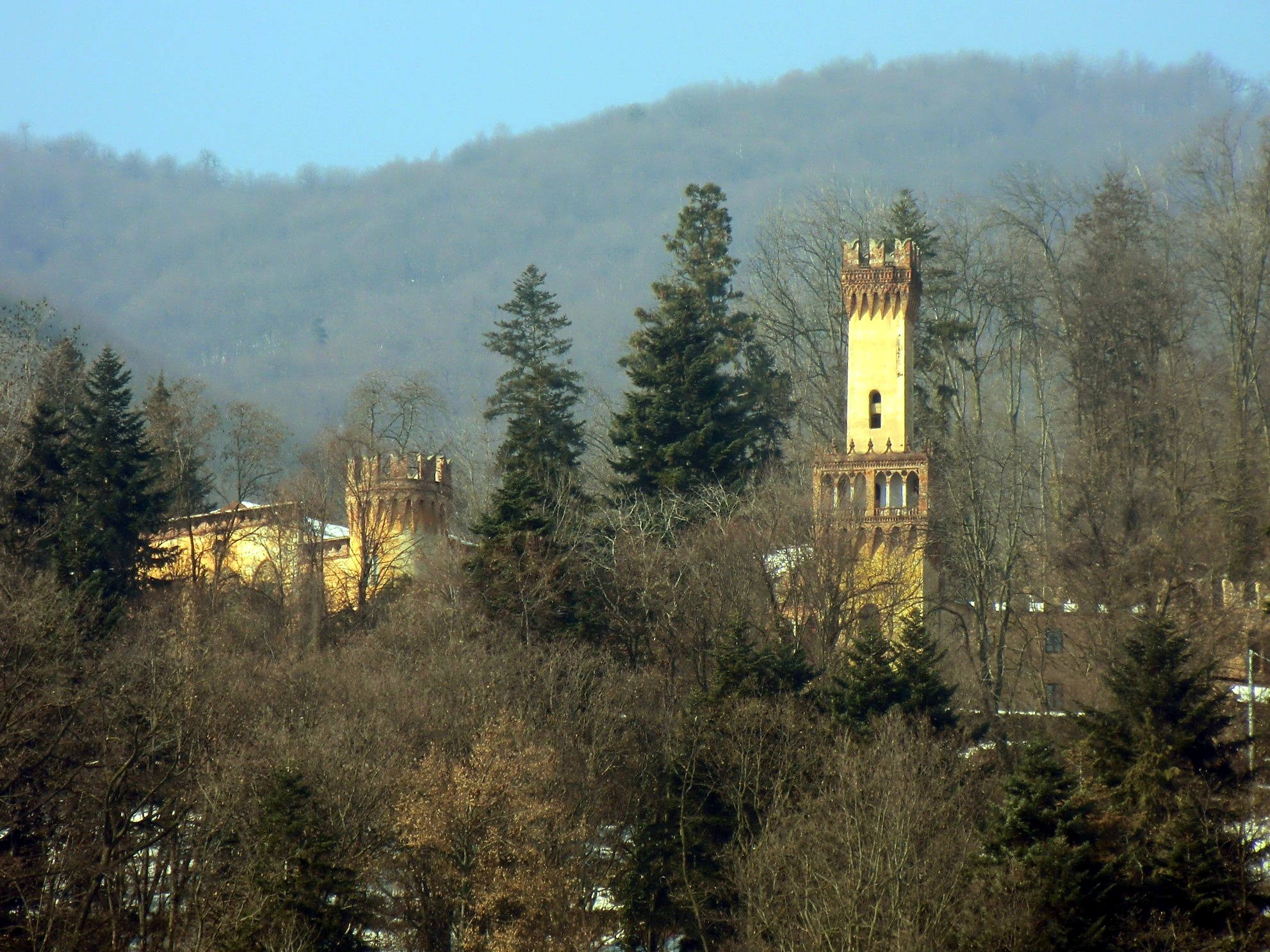

Site history
- Built: 1831

Roccolo Castle looks over the Italian town of Busca, in Piedmont, Italy. Constructed in 1831, it is named for a type of bird snare. Margherita of Savoy was once a regular visitor there.

== Origin ==
The construction of the castle was initiated at the request of Marquis Roberto Tapparelli d’Azeglio and his wife Costanza Alfieri di Sostegno, in 1831. The architecture is an example of neo-medieval revival.

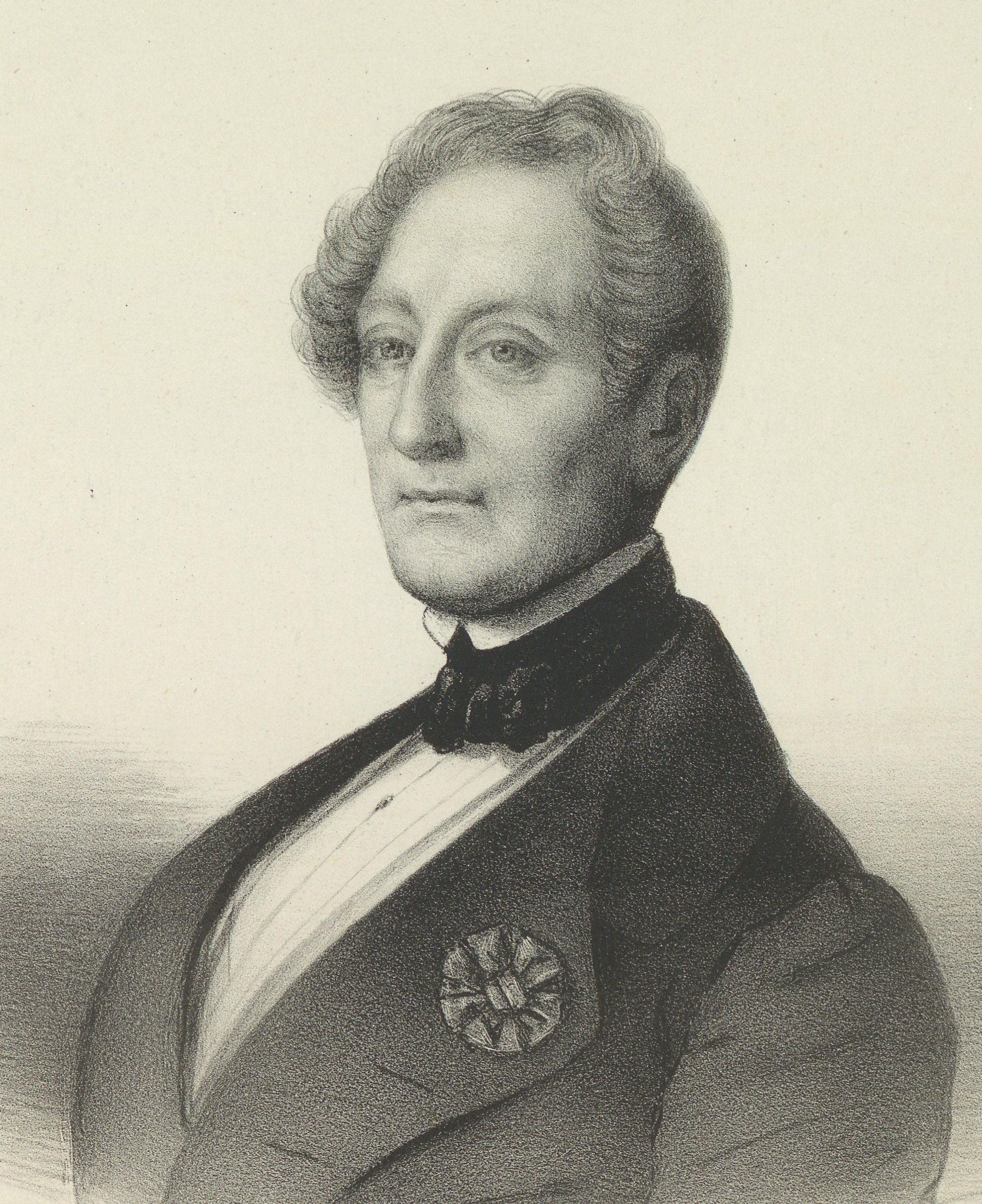
Ritratto di Roberto D’Azeglio

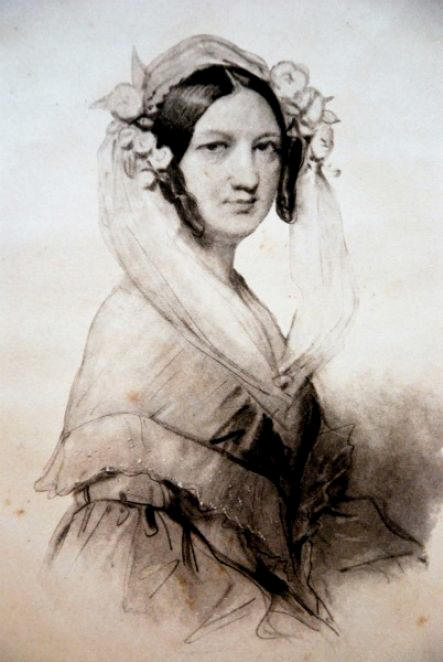
Costanza Alfieri di Sostegno

== Architecture ==
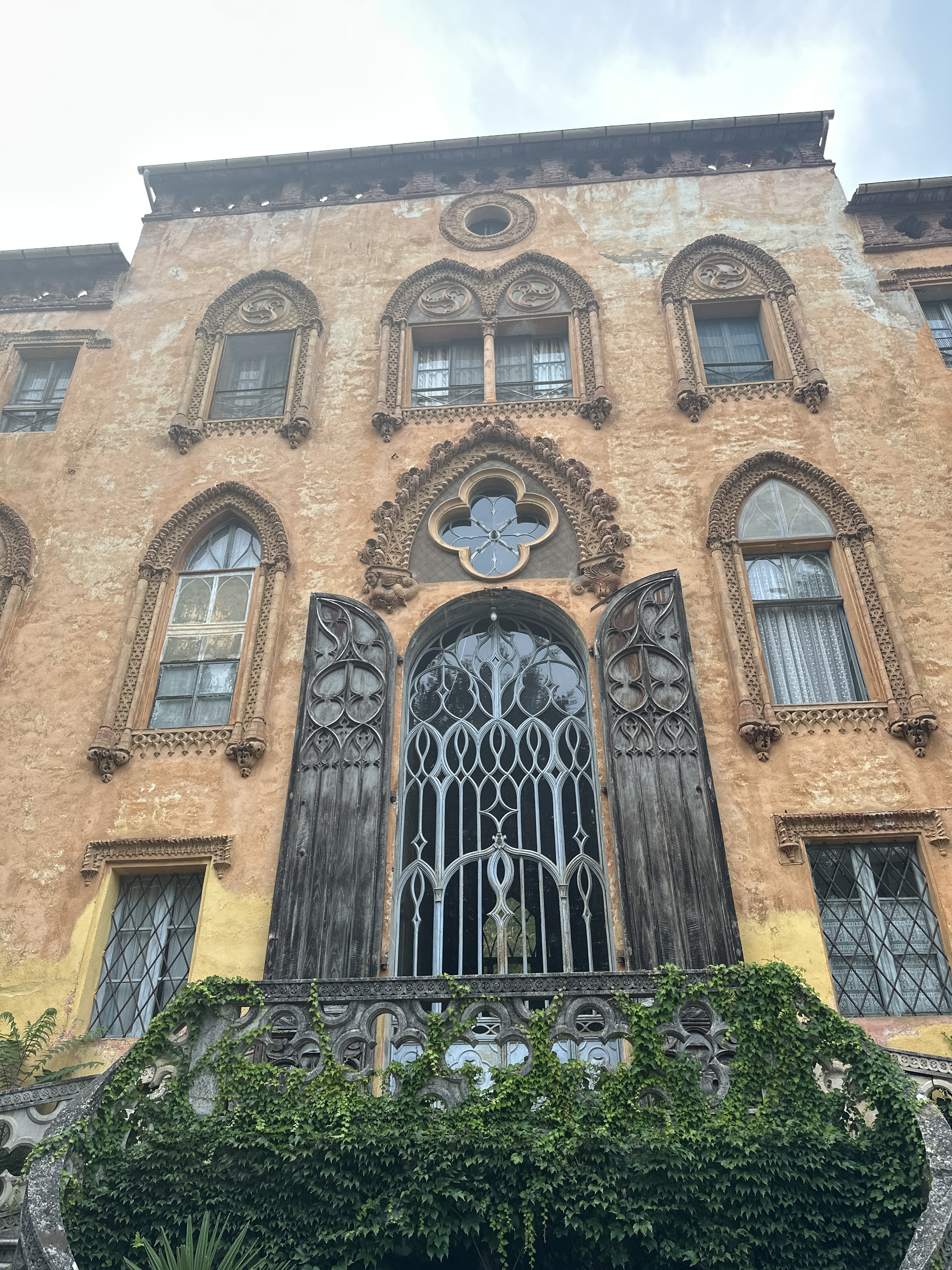
Front balcony

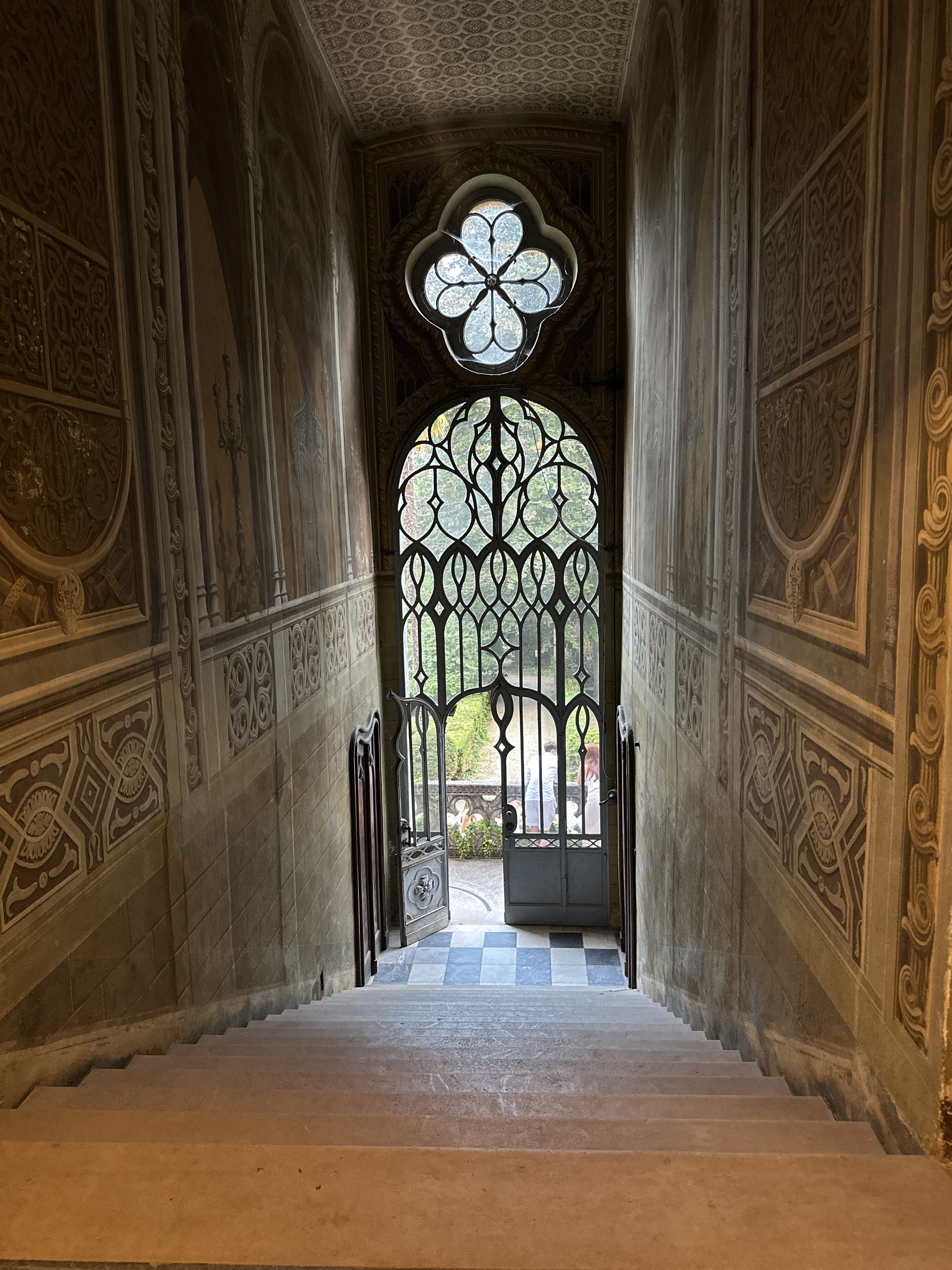
Inside steps

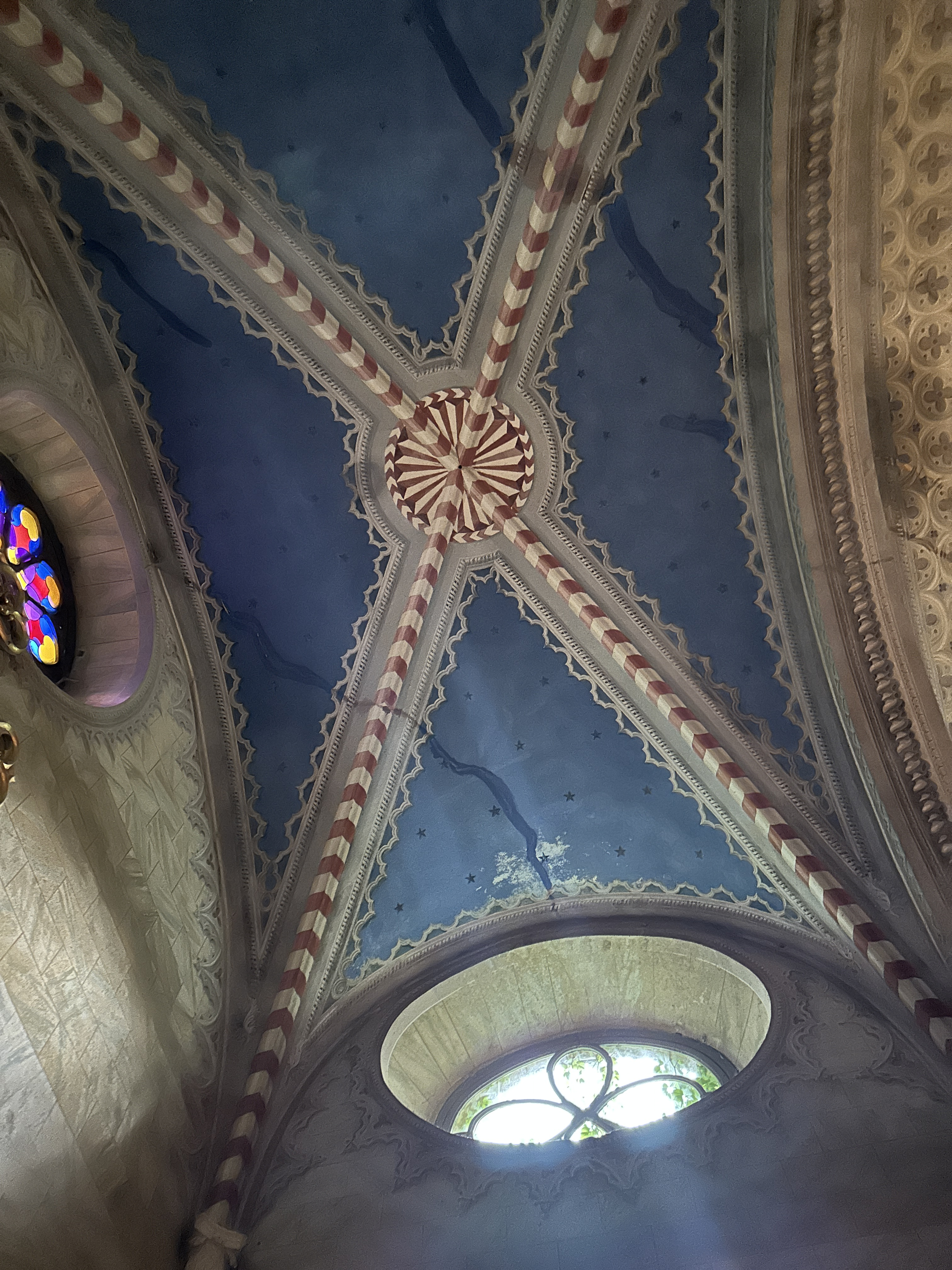
Inside ceiling
