= Villar San Costanzo =

Villar San Costanzo Lo Vilar
- Comune
- Comune di Villar San Costanzo
- Location within Italy Location within Piedmont
- Coordinates: 44°29′N 7°23′E
- Country: Italy
- Region: Piedmont
- Province: Province of Cuneo (CN)
- Frazioni: Morra, Artesio, Rivoira

Area
  - Total: 19.5 km^{2} (7.5 sq mi)
- Elevation: 605 m (1,985 ft)

Population (Aug. 2007)
  - Total: 1,474
  - Density: 75.6/km^{2} (196/sq mi)
- Time zone: UTC+1 (CET)
  - Summer (DST): UTC+2 (CEST)
- Postal code: 12020
- Dialing code: 0171
- Patron saint: Constantius
- Website: Official website

Villar San Costanzo is a comune (municipality) in the Province of Cuneo in the Italian region Piedmont, located about 70 kilometres (43 mi) southwest of Turin and about 15 kilometres (9 mi) northwest of Cuneo. As of 31 August 2007, it had a population of 1,474 and an area of 19.5 square kilometres (7.5 mi^{2}).

Sights to see in Villar San Costanzo include the natural reserve known as Ciciu del Villar; the Abbey built in early 700 AD; and the very ancient church of San Costanzo al Monte, a stunning example of Romanesque-Gothic architecture dating back to the 12th century. The town takes its name from Saint Constantius, a soldier of the Theban Legion, who is said to have been beheaded at the spot now occupied by the sanctuary of San Costanzo al Monte. The local geologic formation known as Ciciu del Villar, which are columns formed by natural erosion, was connected with Constantius' legend: the stones are said to be the Roman soldiers sent to kill him, who were miraculously petrified before they could harm the saint.

Villar San Costanzo borders the following municipalities: Busca, Dronero and Roccabruna.

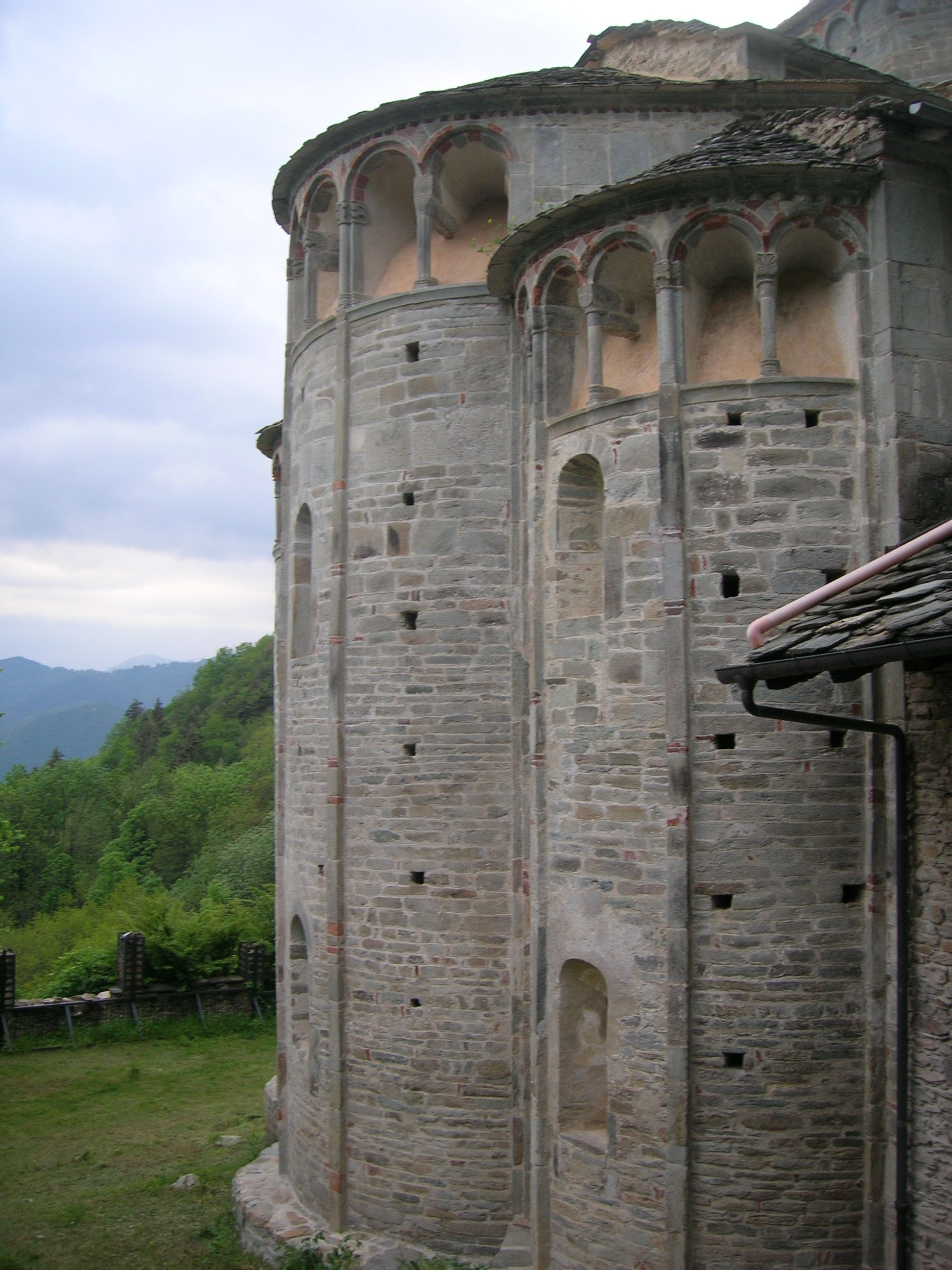
Santuario di San Costanzo al Monte

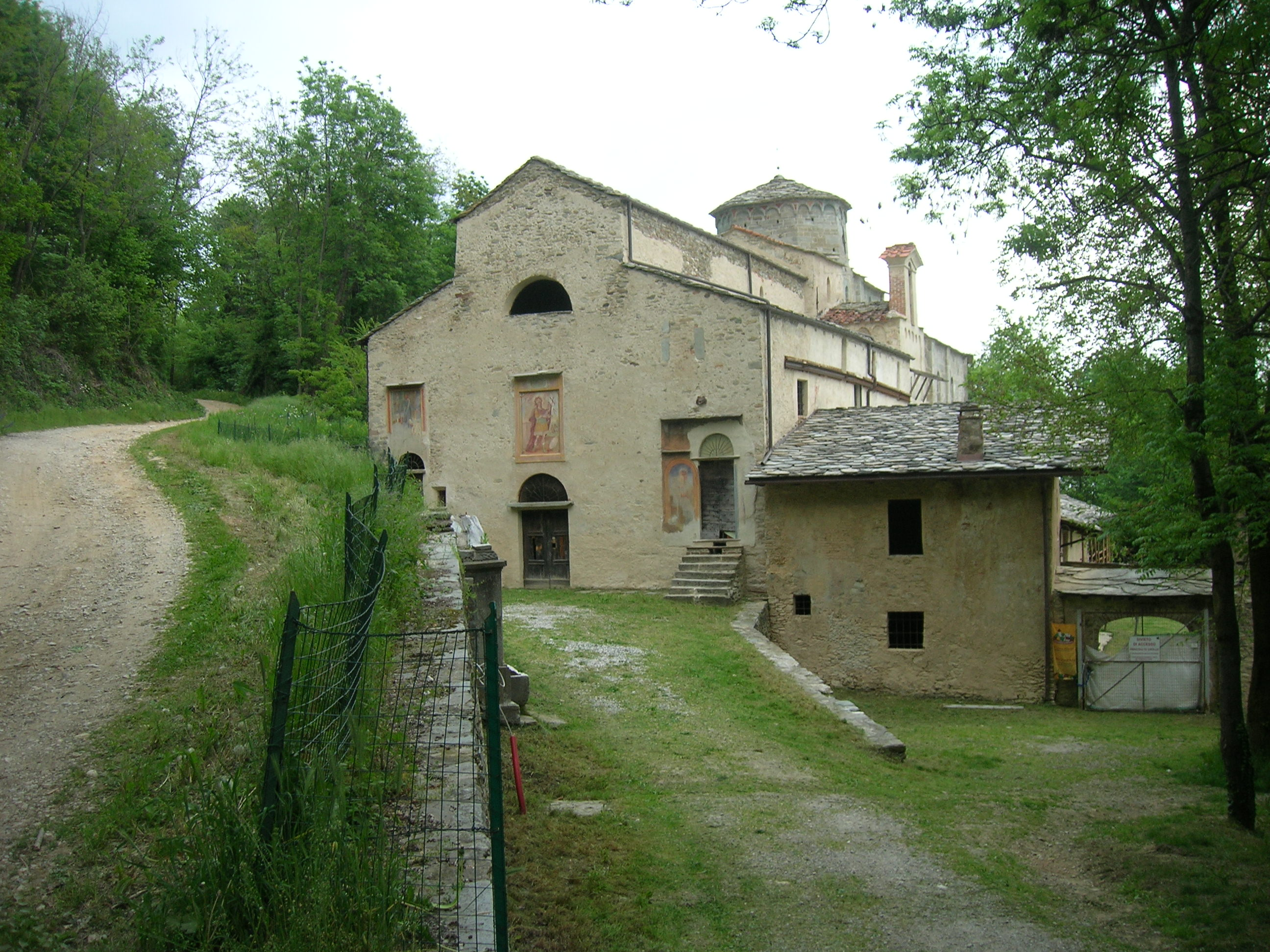
Santuario di San Costanzo al Monte

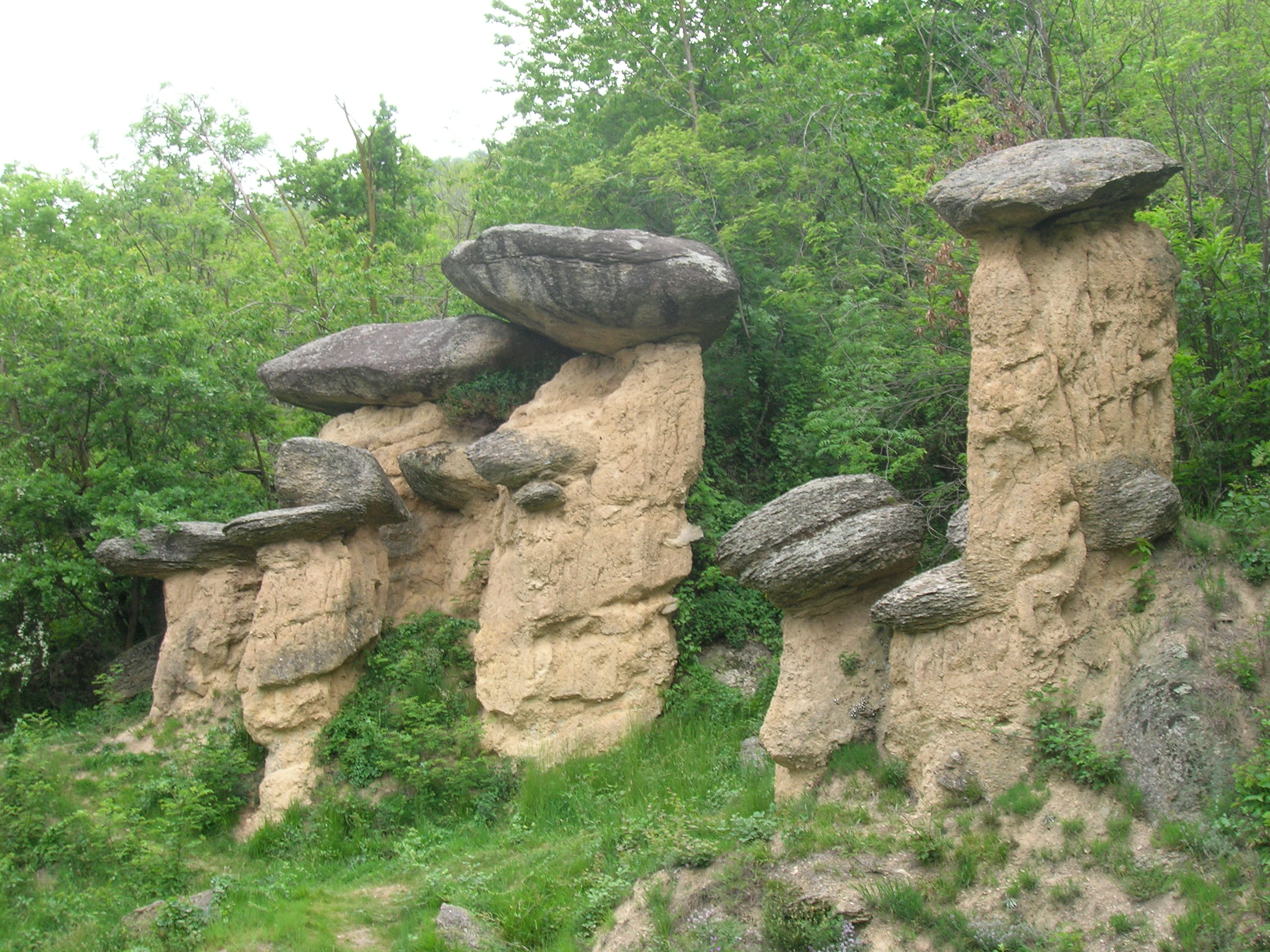
Ciciu del Villar

== Demographic evolution ==
Historical population

| Year | Pop. | ±% |
|---|---|---|
| 1861 | 2,485 | — |
| 1871 | 2,561 | +3.1% |
| 1881 | 2,588 | +1.1% |
| 1901 | 2,431 | −6.1% |
| 1911 | 2,554 | +5.1% |

| Year | Pop. | ±% |
|---|---|---|
| 1921 | 2,501 | −2.1% |
| 1931 | 2,152 | −14.0% |
| 1936 | 2,132 | −0.9% |
| 1951 | 1,910 | −10.4% |
| 1961 | 1,641 | −14.1% |

| Year | Pop. | ±% |
|---|---|---|
| 1971 | 1,451 | −11.6% |
| 1981 | 1,223 | −15.7% |
| 1991 | 1,207 | −1.3% |
| 2001 | 1,396 | +15.7% |

Source: Data from ISTAT

== Twin towns ==
Villar San Costanzo is twinned with:

- Rosières, Haute-Loire, France
