= San Damiano Macra =

San Damiano Macra Sant Damian (Occitan)
- Comune
- Comune di San Damiano Macra
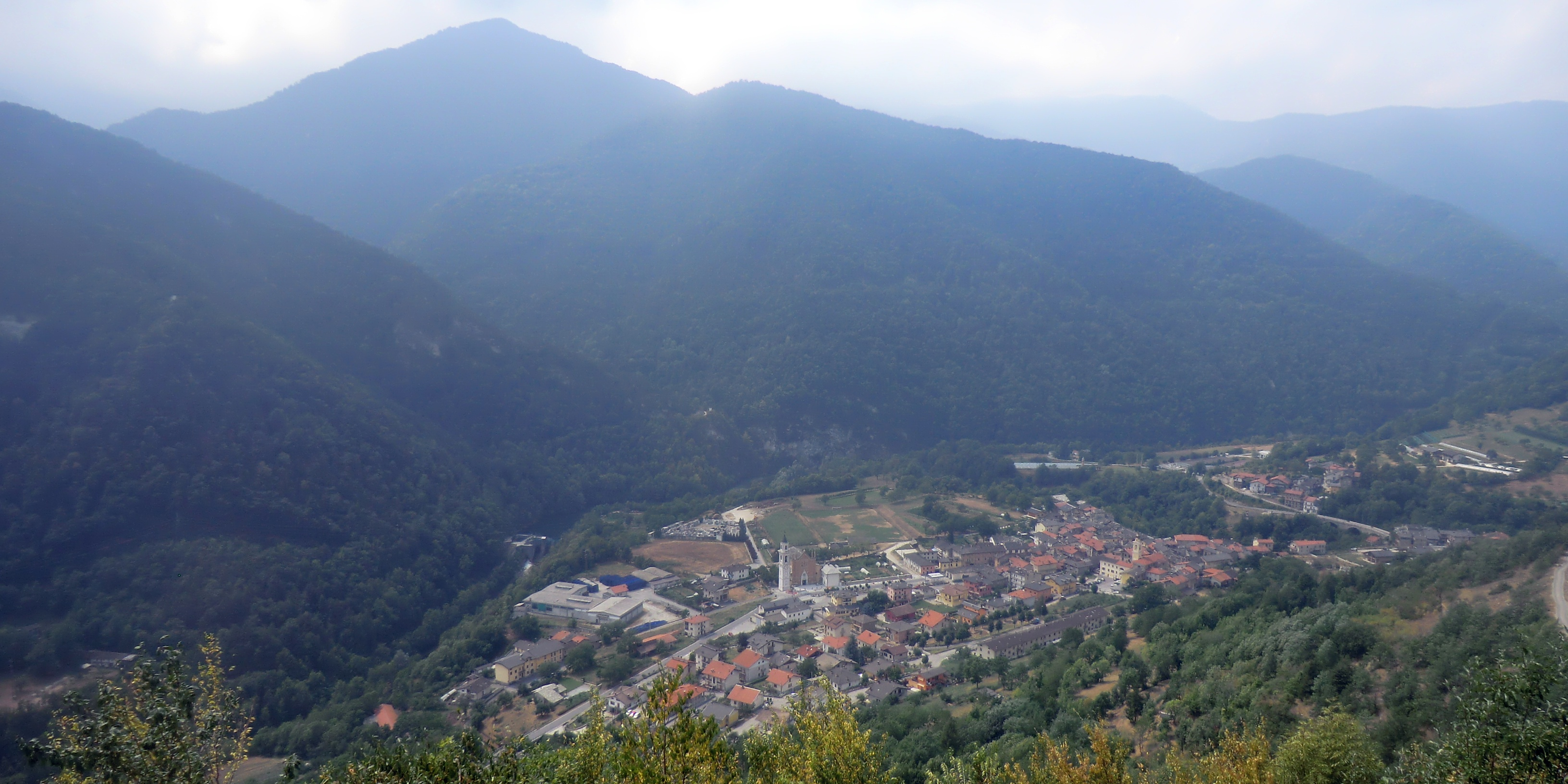

- Location within Italy Location within Piedmont
- Coordinates: 44°29′N 7°15′E
- Country: Italy
- Region: Piedmont
- Province: Cuneo (CN)
- Frazioni: Lottulo, Paglieres, Pagliero

Government
  - Mayor: Diego Durando

Area
  - Total: 54.2 km^{2} (20.9 sq mi)
- Elevation: 743 m (2,438 ft)

Population (31 December 2010)
  - Total: 451
  - Density: 8.32/km^{2} (21.6/sq mi)
- Demonym: Sandamianesi
- Time zone: UTC+1 (CET)
  - Summer (DST): UTC+2 (CEST)
- Postal code: 12029
- Dialing code: 0171
- Website: www.comune.sandamianomacra.cn.it

San Damiano Macra (Occitan: Sant Damian; Piedmontese: San Damian) is a comune (municipality) in the Province of Cuneo in the Italian region of Piedmont, located about 70 kilometres (43 mi) southwest of Turin and about 25 kilometres (16 mi) northwest of Cuneo.

San Damiano Macra borders the following municipalities: Cartignano, Castelmagno, Celle di Macra, Dronero, Frassino, Macra, Melle, Roccabruna, and Sampeyre.

== History ==
In 1716 it merged with Pagliero. In 1929, the municipalities of Lottulo, Pagliero and Paglieres were joined to San Damiano.
