= Pagliaro =

Pagliaro (pronounced [paʎˈʎaːro]) is an Italian surname, originally denoting someone working with straw (Italian: paglia). Notable people with the surname include:

- Alessandra Pagliaro (born 1997), Italian female weightlifter
- Genny Pagliaro (born 1988), Italian female weightlifter
- Harold E. Pagliaro (1925–2020), American literary scholar
- Jennifer Pagliaro (1983–2019), American singer
- Lou Pagliaro (1919–2009), American table tennis player
- Michel Pagliaro (born 1948), Canadian rock singer

== See also ==
- Pagliari
- Pagliero
