= Lottulo =

Former municipality in Cuneo Province, Italy

Lottulo Lòtol (Occitan)
- Frazione
- Location of Lottulo in Italy
- Coordinates: 44°29′N 7°13′E
- Country: Italy
- Region: Piedmont
- Province: Cuneo (CN)
- Comune: San Damiano Macra

Area
  - Total: 8.58 km^{2} (3.31 sq mi)

Population 1921 census
  - Total: 322
  - Density: 37.5/km^{2} (97.2/sq mi)
- Time zone: UTC+1 (CET)
  - Summer (DST): UTC+2 (CEST)
- Postal code: 12029

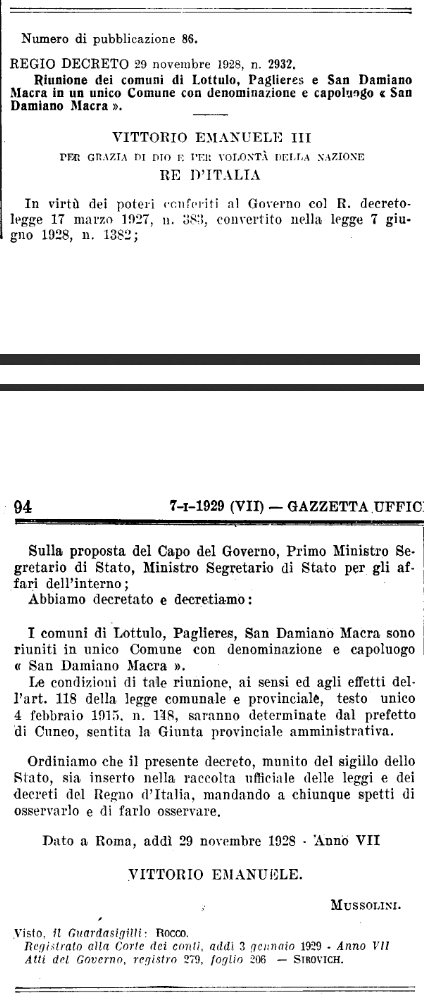

Lottulo (Italian: [ˈlɔttulo]; Occitan: Lòtol) is a former municipality in Province of Cuneo, northwestern Italy. On 22 January 1929, it was merged into San Damiano Macra.
