= Busca, Piedmont =

Busca
- Comune
- Comune di Busca
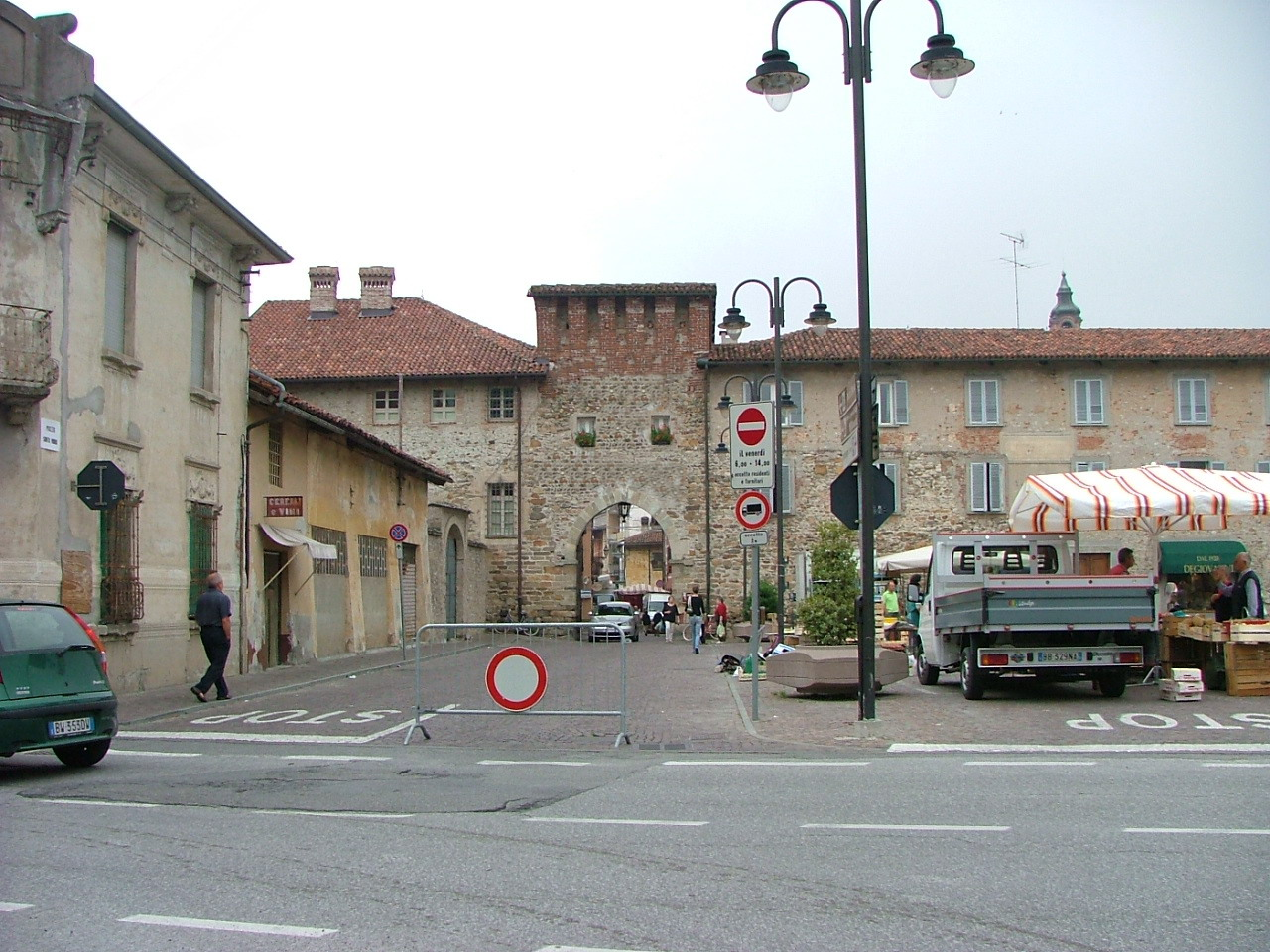

- Location within Italy Location within Piedmont
- Coordinates: 44°31′N 7°28′E
- Country: Italy
- Region: Piedmont
- Province: Cuneo (CN)
- Frazioni: Attissano, Bosco, Castelletto, Morra San Giovanni, Sant'Alessio, San Barnaba, San Chiaffredo, San Martino, San Mauro, San Quintino, San Rocco, Santo Stefano, San Vitale, Valmala

Government
  - Mayor: Marco Gallo

Area
  - Total: 65.8 km^{2} (25.4 sq mi)
- Elevation: 500 m (1,600 ft)

Population (30 April 2017)
  - Total: 10,116
  - Density: 154/km^{2} (398/sq mi)
- Demonym: Buschesi
- Time zone: UTC+1 (CET)
  - Summer (DST): UTC+2 (CEST)
- Postal code: 12022
- Dialing code: 0171
- Website: Official website

Busca is a comune (municipality) in the Province of Cuneo in the Italian region of Piedmont. It is located about 60 kilometres (37 mi) southwest of Turin and about 15 kilometres (9 mi) northwest of Cuneo.

Busca borders the following municipalities: Brossasco, Caraglio, Costigliole Saluzzo, Cuneo, Dronero, Melle, Saluzzo, Roccabruna, Rossana, Tarantasca, Venasca, Villafalletto and Villar San Costanzo.

== History ==
A cholera outbreak occurred in the town in the summer of 1884. In early 2019 and as a result of a referendum held in summer 2018, the municipality of Busca merged with the neighbouring comune of Valmala.

The town is home to the Castle Roccolo.

== Twin cities ==
Twin cities of Busca include the following:

- San Marcos Sud, Argentina
- Cruz Alta, Argentina
