= Tarantasca =

- Comune
- Comune di Tarantasca
- Location within Italy Location within Piedmont
- Coordinates: 44°30′N 7°33′E
- Country: Italy
- Region: Piedmont
- Province: Cuneo (CN)
- Frazioni: San Chiaffredo, Santa Cristina, Tasnere

Government
  - Mayor: Bruna Giordano

Area
  - Total: 12.2 km^{2} (4.7 sq mi)
- Elevation: 451 m (1,480 ft)

Population (31 January 2017)
  - Total: 2,102
  - Density: 172/km^{2} (446/sq mi)
- Demonym: Tarantaschesei
- Time zone: UTC+1 (CET)
  - Summer (DST): UTC+2 (CEST)
- Postal code: 12020
- Dialing code: 0171
- Website: Official website

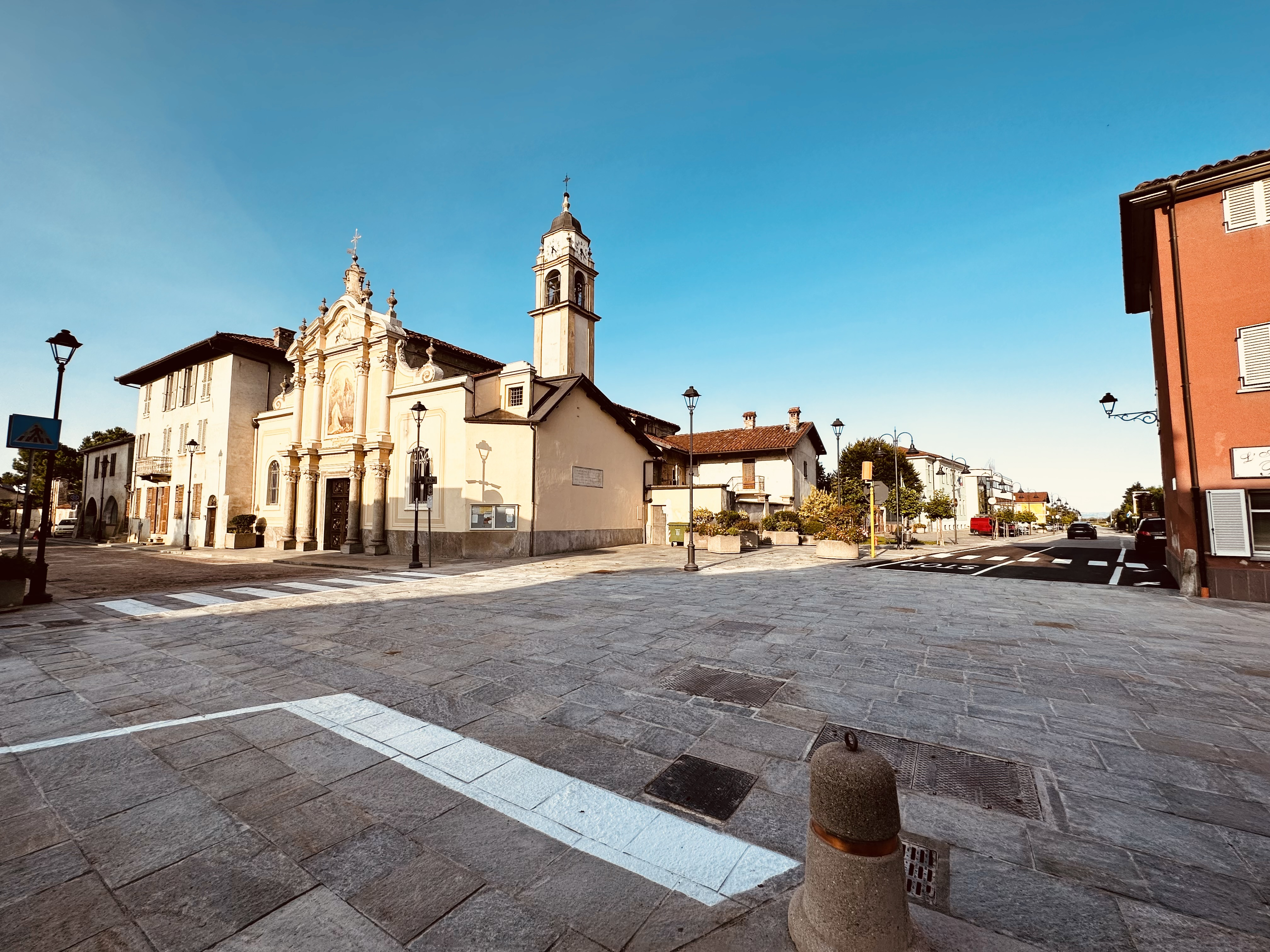
The church of San Bernardo at the Historic center of Tarantasca

Tarantasca is a comune (municipality) in the Province of Cuneo in the Italian region Piedmont. It is located about 60 kilometres (37 mi) south of Turin and about 13 kilometres (8 mi) north of Cuneo.

Tarantasca borders the following municipalities: Busca, Centallo, Cuneo, and Villafalletto.
