= Cartignano =

Cartignano Cartinhan
- Comune
- Comune di Cartignano
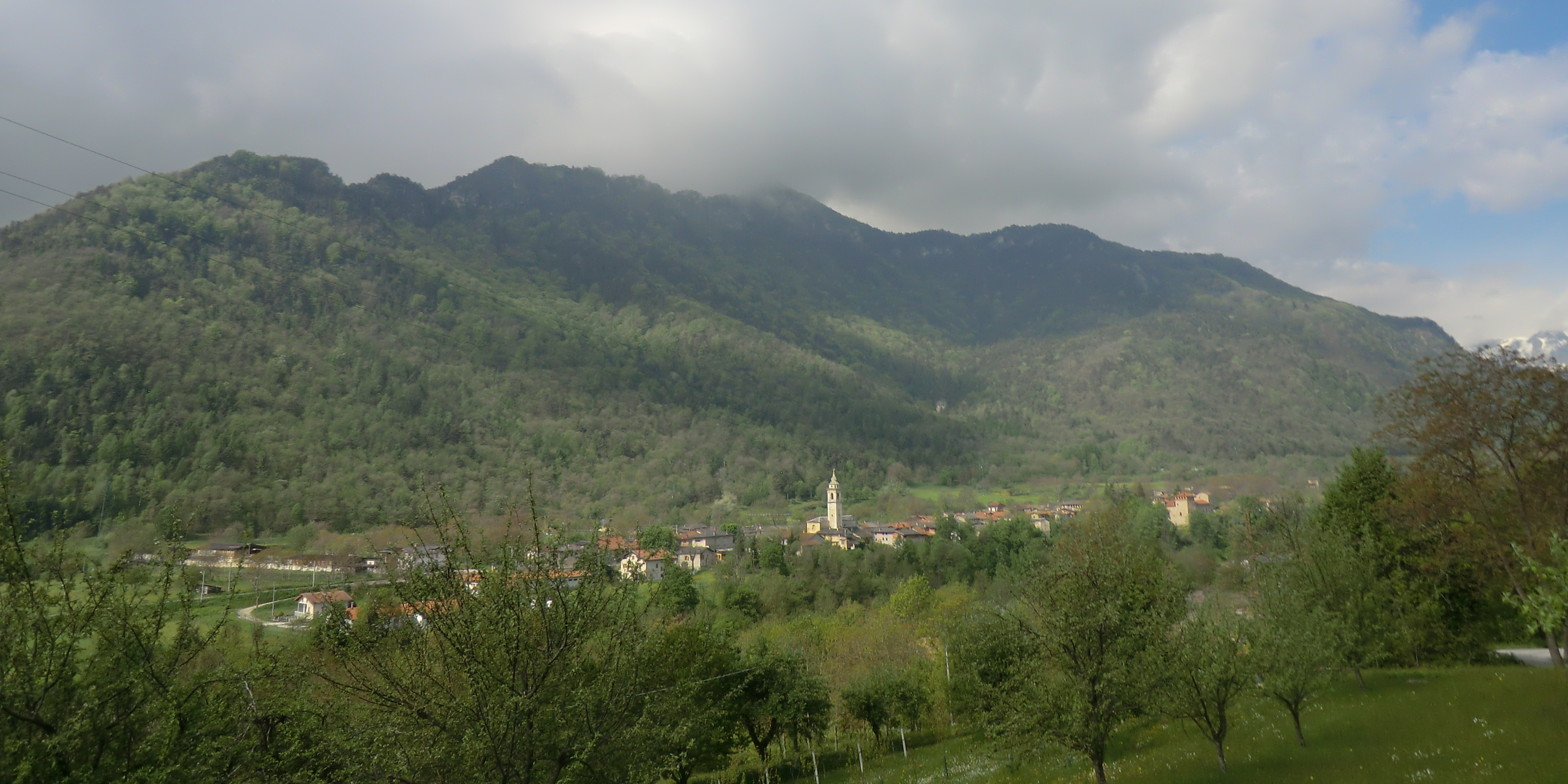

- Location within Italy Location within Piedmont
- Coordinates: 44°29′N 7°17′E
- Country: Italy
- Region: Piedmont
- Province: Cuneo (CN)

Government
  - Mayor: Diego Einaudi

Area
  - Total: 6.5 km^{2} (2.5 sq mi)
- Elevation: 704 m (2,310 ft)

Population (31 May 2017)
  - Total: 194
  - Density: 30/km^{2} (77/sq mi)
- Demonym: Cartignanesi
- Time zone: UTC+1 (CET)
  - Summer (DST): UTC+2 (CEST)
- Postal code: 12020
- Dialing code: 0171
- Website: Official website

Cartignano is a comune (municipality) in the Province of Cuneo in the Italian region Piedmont, located about 70 kilometres (43 mi) southwest of Turin and about 25 kilometres (16 mi) northwest of Cuneo.

Cartignano borders the following municipalities: Dronero, Melle, Roccabruna, and San Damiano Macra.
