= Villafalletto =

- Comune
- Comune di Villafalletto
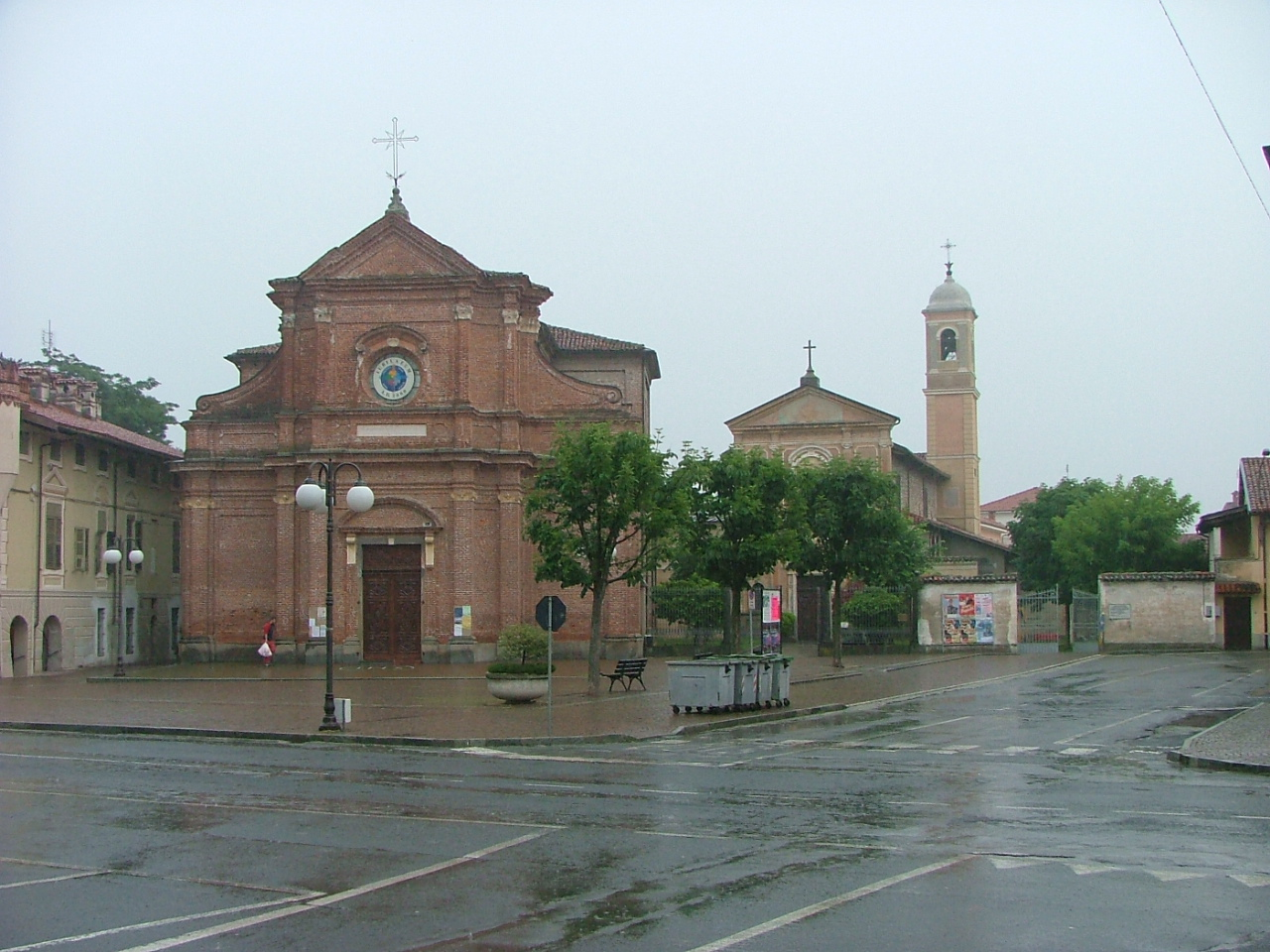
- A view of the town

- Coat of arms

- Location within Italy Location within Piedmont
- Coordinates: 44°33′N 7°32′E
- Country: Italy
- Region: Piedmont
- Province: Cuneo (CN)
- Frazioni: Gerbola, Prà, Presidenta, Termine

Government
  - Mayor: Giuseppe Sarcinelli

Area
  - Total: 29.73 km^{2} (11.48 sq mi)
- Elevation: 431 m (1,414 ft)

Population (1 January 2021)
  - Total: 2,876
  - Density: 96.74/km^{2} (250.5/sq mi)
- Demonym: Villafallettese(i)
- Time zone: UTC+1 (CET)
  - Summer (DST): UTC+2 (CEST)
- Postal code: 12020
- Dialing code: 0171
- Website: Official website

Villafalletto is a comune (municipality) in the Province of Cuneo in the Italian region Piedmont, located about 60 kilometres (37 mi) south of Turin and about 20 kilometres (12 mi) north of Cuneo.

Villafalletto borders the following municipalities: Busca, Centallo, Costigliole Saluzzo, Fossano, Savigliano, Tarantasca, Verzuolo, and Vottignasco. It is located on the right bank of the Maira.

Villafalletto is the birthplace of anarchist Bartolomeo Vanzetti, executed with Nicola Sacco in 1927 following a controversial American trial.

== Twin towns ==
- Torremaggiore, Italy, since 2009
