= Roccabruna =

Roccabruna La Ròcha
- Comune
- Comune di Roccabruna
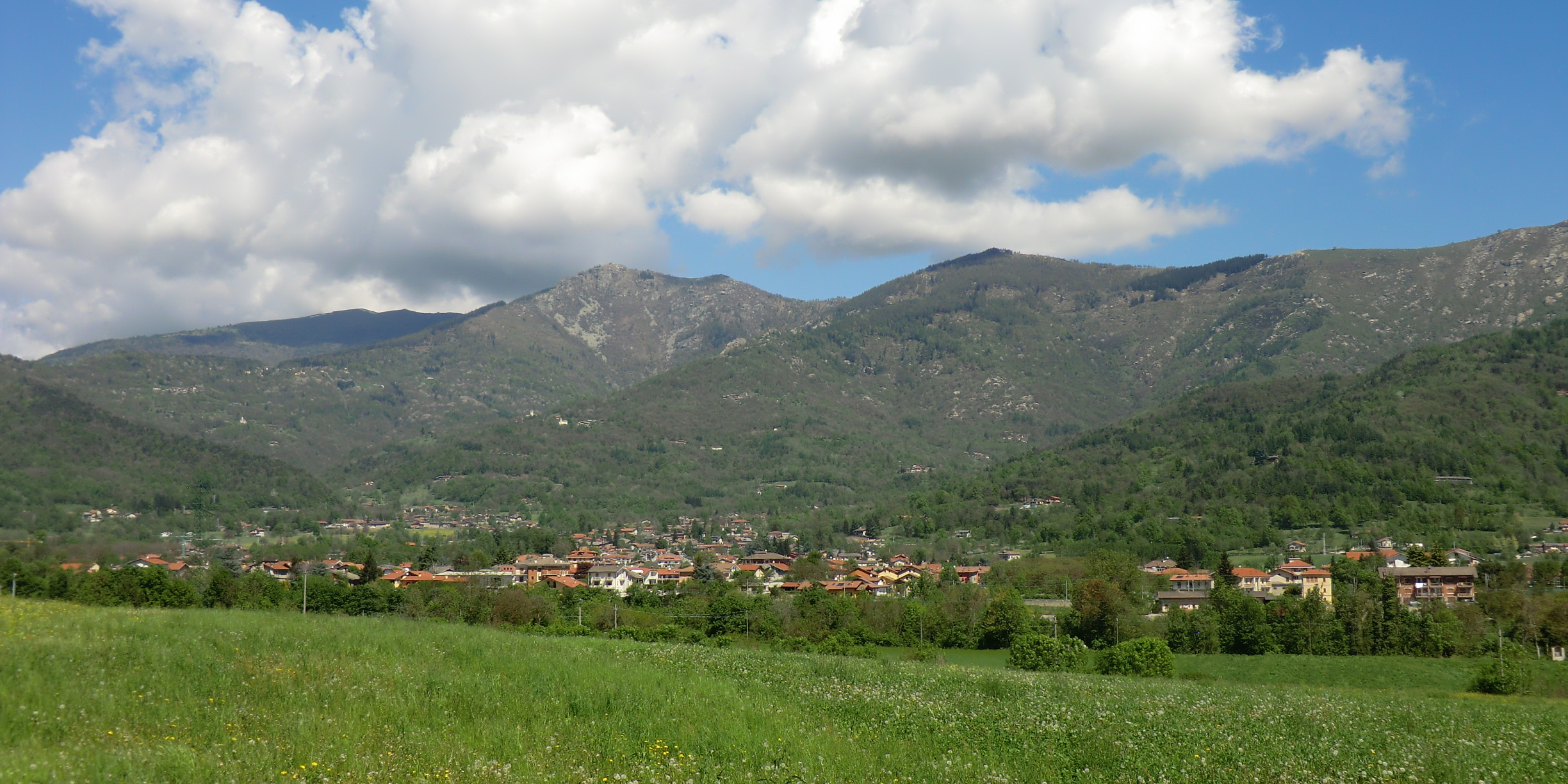

- Location within Italy Location within Piedmont
- Coordinates: 44°30′N 7°20′E
- Country: Italy
- Region: Piedmont
- Province: Cuneo (CN)

Government
  - Mayor: Claudio Garnero

Area
  - Total: 24.1 km^{2} (9.3 sq mi)
- Highest elevation: 1,939 m (6,362 ft)
- Lowest elevation: 640 m (2,100 ft)

Population (31 December 2010)
  - Total: 1,603
  - Density: 66.5/km^{2} (172/sq mi)
- Demonym: Roccabrunesi
- Time zone: UTC+1 (CET)
  - Summer (DST): UTC+2 (CEST)
- Postal code: 12020
- Dialing code: 0171
- Website: Official website

Roccabruna (Italian pronunciation: [ˌrɔkkaˈbruːna]; Occitan: La Ròcha de Draonier or Ròcabruna; Piedmontese: La Ròcia ëd Droné) is a commune in the Province of Cuneo and the Italian region of Piedmont, located about 70 kilometres (43 mi) southwest of Turin and about 20 kilometres (12 mi) northwest of Cuneo.

Roccabruna borders the following municipalities: Cartignano, Dronero, Melle, San Damiano Macra, Busca and Villar San Costanzo.
