= Pagliero, Cuneo =

Village in Italy

Pagliero (Italian: [paʎˈʎɛːro]; Occitan: Palhier) is a village and a former community in the Maira Valley, Province of Cuneo, northwestern Italy. Administratively, it is a frazione (borough) of the municipality of San Damiano Macra, and it is a parish of the Roman Catholic Diocese of Saluzzo.

Old charters name the village Paliarum or Paglierum. It was cited as early as in 1028 in the charter of the foundation of the abbey of Carmagnola. It was a part of the marquisate of San Damiano before being merged with San Damiano in 1716.

In 1931, the village had 902 inhabitants.
