= Vottignasco =

- Comune
- Comune di Vottignasco
- Coat of arms

- Location within Italy Location within Piedmont
- Coordinates: 44°34′N 7°35′E
- Country: Italy
- Region: Piedmont
- Province: Cuneo (CN)
- Frazioni: Tetti Falchi

Government
  - Mayor: Daniela Patrizia Costamagna

Area
  - Total: 8.4 km^{2} (3.2 sq mi)
- Elevation: 380 m (1,250 ft)

Population (31 May 2009)
  - Total: 552
  - Density: 66/km^{2} (170/sq mi)
- Demonym: Vottignaschesi
- Time zone: UTC+1 (CET)
  - Summer (DST): UTC+2 (CEST)
- Postal code: 12020
- Dialing code: 0171

Vottignasco is a comune (municipality) in the Province of Cuneo in the Italian region Piedmont, located about 60 kilometres (37 mi) south of Turin and about 20 kilometres (12 mi) north of Cuneo.

Vottignasco borders two other municipalities: Savigliano and Villafalletto.
