= Giovanni Battista Pagliari =

Italian painter (1741–1816)

Giovanni Battista Pagliari (1741- January 8, 1816) was an Italian painter and art restorer.

He restored the Circumcision painted by Boccaccio Boccaccino for the Cremona Cathedral. In 1810, he restored the Martyrdom of St Thomas, Archbishop of Canterbury (1657), originally by Giovanni Battista Natali, found at the church of San Pietro in Cremona.
