= Melle, Piedmont =

Melle Lo Mèl
- Comune
- Comune di Melle
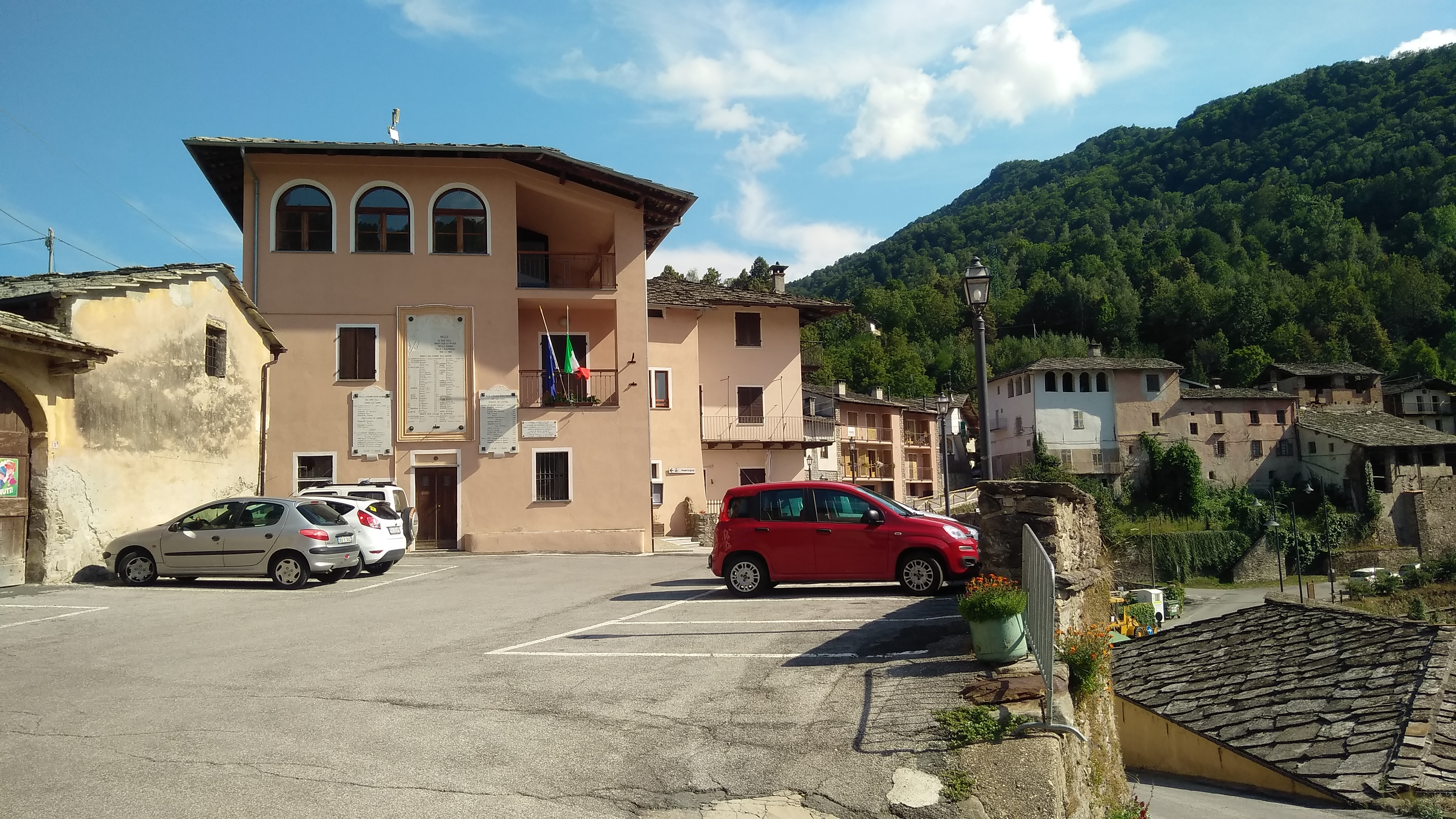
- Town hall

- Location within Italy Location within Piedmont
- Coordinates: 44°34′N 7°19′E
- Country: Italy
- Region: Piedmont
- Province: Province of Cuneo (CN)

Area
  - Total: 28.0 km^{2} (10.8 sq mi)

Population (Dec. 2004)
  - Total: 340
  - Density: 12/km^{2} (31/sq mi)
- Time zone: UTC+1 (CET)
  - Summer (DST): UTC+2 (CEST)
- Postal code: 12020
- Dialing code: 0175
- Website: Official website

Melle (Lo Mèl in Occitan) is a comune (municipality) in the Province of Cuneo in the Italian region of Piedmont, located about 60 kilometres (37 mi) southwest of Turin and about 30 kilometres (19 mi) northwest of Cuneo. As of 31 December 2004, it had a population of 340 and an area of 28.0 square kilometres (10.8 mi^{2}).

Melle borders the following municipalities: Brossasco, Cartignano, Frassino, Roccabruna, San Damiano Macra, and Busca.

== Demographic evolution ==
Historical population

Year	Pop.	±%
1861	2,244	—
1871	2,512	+11.9%
1881	2,558	+1.8%
1901	2,451	−4.2%
1911	2,463	+0.5%

Year	Pop.	±%
1921	2,381	−3.3%
1931	1,969	−17.3%
1936	1,808	−8.2%
1951	1,449	−19.9%
1961	1,109	−23.5%

Year	Pop.	±%
1971	752	−32.2%
1981	552	−26.6%
1991	455	−17.6%
2001	364	−20.0%

Source: Data from ISTAT
