= Rossana, Piedmont =

Rossana
- Comune
- Comune di Rossana
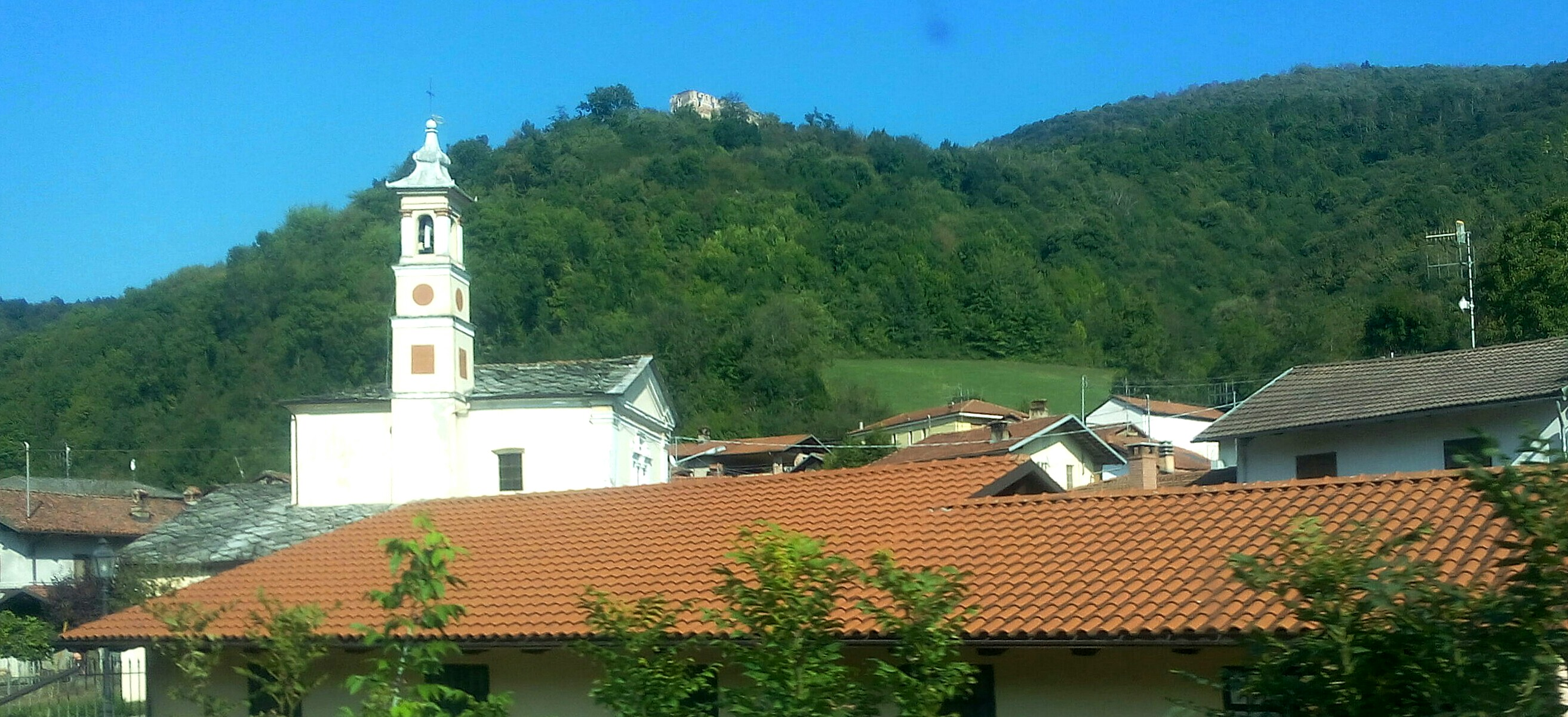

- Location within Italy Location within Piedmont
- Coordinates: 44°32′N 7°26′E
- Country: Italy
- Region: Piedmont
- Province: Province of Cuneo (CN)

Area
  - Total: 19.9 km^{2} (7.7 sq mi)

Population (Dec. 2004)
  - Total: 950
  - Density: 48/km^{2} (120/sq mi)
- Time zone: UTC+1 (CET)
  - Summer (DST): UTC+2 (CEST)
- Postal code: 12020
- Dialing code: 0175

Rossana is a comune (municipality) in the Province of Cuneo in the Italian region Piedmont, located about 60 kilometres (37 mi) southwest of Turin and about 20 kilometres (12 mi) northwest of Cuneo. As of 31 December 2004, it had a population of 950 and an area of 19.9 square kilometres (7.7 mi^{2}).

Rossana borders the following municipalities: Busca, Costigliole Saluzzo, Piasco and Venasca.

== Demographic evolution ==
Historical population

Year	Pop.	±%
1861	2,360	—
1871	2,576	+9.2%
1881	2,497	−3.1%
1901	2,505	+0.3%
1911	2,449	−2.2%

Year	Pop.	±%
1921	2,265	−7.5%
1931	1,988	−12.2%
1936	1,908	−4.0%
1951	1,576	−17.4%
1961	1,414	−10.3%

Year	Pop.	±%
1971	1,156	−18.2%
1981	1,009	−12.7%
1991	979	−3.0%
2001	934	−4.6%

Source: Data from ISTAT
