= Centallo =

- Comune
- Comune di Centallo
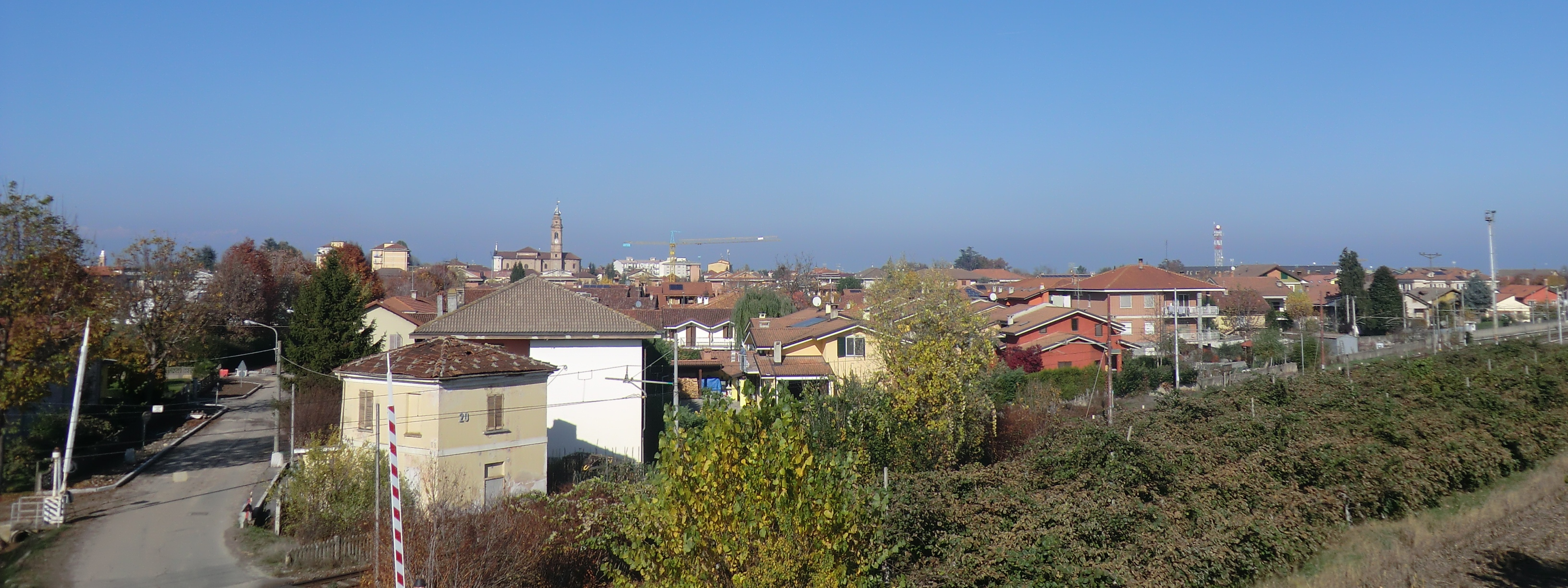

- Location within Italy Location within Piedmont
- Coordinates: 44°30′N 7°35′E
- Country: Italy
- Region: Piedmont
- Province: Cuneo (CN)
- Frazioni: San Biagio, Roata Chiusani

Government
  - Mayor: Giuseppe Chiavassa

Area
  - Total: 42.49 km^{2} (16.41 sq mi)
- Elevation: 424 m (1,391 ft)

Population (30 November 2017)
  - Total: 6,988
  - Density: 164.5/km^{2} (426.0/sq mi)
- Demonym: Centallesi
- Time zone: UTC+1 (CET)
  - Summer (DST): UTC+2 (CEST)
- Postal code: 12044
- Dialing code: 0171

Centallo is a comune (municipality) in the Province of Cuneo, in the Italian region Piedmont. It is located approximately 60 kilometres (37 mi) south of Turin and about 13 kilometres (8 mi) north of Cuneo.

The municipality includes the frazioni (subdivisions, mainly villages and hamlets) of San Biagio and Roata Chiusani.

Centallo borders the municipalities of Castelletto Stura, Cuneo, Fossano, Montanera, Tarantasca, and Villafalletto.

== Geography ==
The territory of Centallo covers an area of 44 square kilometres (17 square miles) and borders the municipalities of Cuneo, Villafalletto, Fossano, Montanera, Castelletto Stura, and Tarantasca. It is situated at an elevation of 424 metres (1,391 ft) above sea level, and the terrain is predominantly flat. The Grana River flows to the west of the town, while the Stura di Demonte River runs along its eastern border.

== History ==
Centallo occupies a strategic location with ancient Roman origins. Over the centuries, it was contested by Cuneo, Saluzzo, and the House of Savoy. During the Lombard period, the territory was under the influence of the Abbey of San Dalmazzo di Pedona. It is first mentioned in a donation document from the mid-11th century.

The town was considered a desirable possession, reportedly attracting interest from the second son of the King of England. The Bolleri family, connected to the King of France, later established themselves in Centallo, remaining until the extinction of their lineage.

In the 16th century, as conflicts between the French and the Spanish intensified in northern Italy, Centallo gained strategic importance. The town was involved in a siege during which Torquato Tasso, author of Jerusalem Delivered, recounted the "liberation" of Centallo by Spanish forces who came to the aid of Cuneo and Fossano in opposition to the French. The surviving portion of the local castle was destroyed in 1589. From this period onward, Centallo developed into a significant agricultural centre.

In the 19th century, a major emigration of locals to other countries began to take place in search of economic and commercial opportunities. Among them was Bartholomew Dardanelli, born in 1830 in Centallo, who served as the Italian consul in Melbourne.

=== Symbols ===
The coat of arms of Centallo was officially recognised by decree of the Head of Government on 19 June 1931. The flag is described as "red, with a blue belt charged with three heraldic golden roses, studded with the same and placed in a band". The belt is a canting reference to the toponym and derives from the arms of the family that once ruled the town, known as Da Centallo ("Red, with a blue belt edged and adorned in gold, placed in a bar"). The emblem, granted by D.C.G. on 4 August 1933, is imprinted on purple cloth.

=== Honors ===
On 29 December 1944, the municipality was awarded the Bronze Medal for Civil Merit for its actions during the Second World War. Following the destruction of a local orphanage by an aerial bombing, the population assisted the victims with remarkable solidarity. Volunteers dug through rubble with their bare hands to rescue survivors, transporting them on foot to the local hospital despite air raid alarms and a curfew.

With generous and spontaneous altruistic fervor, the entire population came to the aid of the girls residing in the local orphanage, which had been destroyed by a bombing with high-explosive devices dropped by an allied aircraft. In an extraordinary display of solidarity, numerous volunteers tirelessly dug with their bare hands through the rubble to extract the victims and the severely injured survivors, carrying them on foot to the local hospital, despite the threat of air raid alarms and curfew. A clear example of unconditional love for others and elevated civic virtues.

— Centallo (CN), Text imprinted somewhere within the town on 29 December 1944

== Attractions ==
=== Religious architectures ===
Centallo contains several notable religious buildings:

- Parish Church of San Giovanni Battista
- Church of San Michele
- Church of San Rocco
- Church of Saints Sebastiano and Battista Decollato
- Church of the Holy Trinity
- Church of Santa Maria ad Nives (also known as Madonna degli Alteni)
- Chapel of San Quirico
- Chapel of San Giovanni Evangelista, which contains early 16th-century paintings depicting the life of the saint in 12 panels
- Chapel of Madonna dei Prati
- Chapel of San Giuliano
- Temple of Madonna di Loreto dei Boschetti
- Parish Church of San Biagio
- Chapel of San Rocco dei Gerbidi, located in San Biagio
- Chapel of Sant'Anna (di Boirino), located in San Biagio
- Parish Church of San Bernardo, located in Roata Chiusani
- Oratory or Temple of San Giovanni Battista
- Remains of the Church of S. Colomba, in the locality of S. Colomba

=== Museums ===
- Museum and birthplace of Cardinal Michele Pellegrino, located in the hamlet of Roata Chiusani

== Demography ==
=== Ethnicities and foreign minorities ===
According to data from the Italian National Institute of Statistics, as of 31 December 2017, there were 798 foreign residents in Centallo. The largest groups by nationality were:

- Albania: 187
- Romania: 122
- Morocco: 111
- India: 58
- Senegal: 56
- Ivory Coast: 45
- Philippines: 45
- Nigeria: 43
- Burkina Faso: 23

== Culture ==
=== Schools ===
Centallo has the following educational institutions:

==== Public schools ====
- Kindergarten
- Primary school in the main town
- Primary school in the hamlet of Roata Chiusani
- Lower secondary school "M. Isoardo"

==== Private schools ====
- Kindergarten "Giovanni Arese" in the hamlet of San Biagio
- Kindergarten "Margaria Macesi" in the hamlet of Roata Chiusani

=== Libraries ===
- Civic Library "Faustino Dalmazzo"

=== Events ===
- Patronal Feast of the Holy Guardian Angels, held on the second Sunday of October
- Biennial Festival of Beans and Peppers, held in September
- Feast of Saint Isidore, held on the second Sunday of May

== Economy ==
The economy of Centallo is based on agriculture, pig farming, fish farming supported by the presence of canals, feed mills, slaughterhouses, furniture manufacturing, and other local industries. The production of musical instruments, particularly organs—both modern and antique—is well known.

A typical agricultural product of the area is the Cuneo bean.

In 2021, the municipality received the "Green Ears" award from FEE Italy.

== Infrastructure and transportation ==
=== Roads ===
The municipality is crossed by the regional road 20 del Colle di Tenda and the state road 231 di Santa Vittoria. The main town is located 8 kilometres (5 mi) from the Cuneo Centro exit of the A33 Asti–Cuneo motorway.

=== Railways ===
Centallo is served by the Torino–Cuneo and Fossano–Cuneo–Limone railway lines.

=== Urban mobility ===
Line 8 of the Cuneo conurbation public transport network operates the route: Cuneo Capolinea Stazione FS – Piazza Torino – Madonna dell'Olmo – Via Torino – Centallo Capolinea. This service connects the municipality to the city of Cuneo, providing access to additional urban and suburban public transport services as well as the Cuneo railway station. During the school term, there is also a bus service (line 188) connecting Centallo to the Hotel Management Institute in Dronero.

=== Airports ===
Centallo is located 5 kilometres (3 mi) from Cuneo–Levaldigi International Airport.

== Sports ==
=== Football ===
The main football club in the municipality is Giovanile Centallo, founded in 2006 as the successor to the former A.S. Centallo. It competes in regional amateur leagues.
