= Paglieri =

Italian consumer goods company

- Company type: Private
- Industry: Consumer goods
- Founder: Luigi Paglieri
- Headquarters: Alessandria, Italy
- Area served: Worldwide
- Key people: Debora Paglieri (CEO), Fabio Rossello (CEO), Lodovico Paglieri (CEO), Ginevra Rossello Paglieri (Board Director), Aldo Paglieri (non-executive Chairman)
- Products: Personal care, Home care, and Fragrances

Paglieri is an Italian consumer goods company specializing in personal care, home care, and fragrances founded by Luigi Paglieri in Alessandria. Paglieri offers a diverse range of products present in over 50 countries. In 2001, the company founded Selectiva Spa, with the brands Aquolina, Pink Sugar, and, since 2010, has owned Schiapparelli Farmaceutici and Agopag, since December 2022.

== History ==
In 1807, Luigi Paglieri opened a shop in Alessandria, in what was then Via Ravanale (currently Via Mazzini). In 1830, the shop was transferred to Piazza Vittorio Emanuele (now Piazza Libertà), in a much more favorable position. The commercial function was also added to the production one, as the production of creams, powders, rouges, and wigs on an artisanal scale began in the back shop.

The company Paglieri was founded in 1876 by Luigi Paglieri and his son Lodovico in Alessandria, Italy. Starting as a small family-run business, Paglieri initially focused on the production of traditional Italian perfumes and cosmetics.

In the early 1900s Luigi Paglieri, son of Lodovico, had Palazzo Paglieri built, the first in reinforced concrete in that city and the first to have an elevator. It housed the Paglieri family and in the 1930s he opened the factory here. In the 1920s, mass production of perfumes and colognes began. In 1923, the Felce Azzurra Eau de Cologne was released, and in 1926 — the Felce Azzurra talc.

The same years saw, the company created Eaux de Cologne 'Paradiso Perduto', 'Tabacco Ambrato', 'Fior di Loto' and 'Fiori degli Esperidi'; Gran Premio, a perfume for women, Curaderma, the after-bath moisturising cream, and Barbasana for men, to be used at the time of shaving.

In the 1930s, "Velluto di Hollywood", a fine powder that could be applied with either a dry or wet sponge, was launched. The product represented the glamour of American film stars.

In 1940, Paglieri became a limited company. At this time they opened a new factory to produce cases and packaging for their own products. However, the site was bombed during the Second World War, and a new, large factory was rented after the war. The number of employees rose to over 400 and a nursery was opened inside the factory.

At the same time, the company, like many other large and famous brands of the time, embarked on the path of advertising, also engaging famous brands for its billboards, among all that of Gino Boccasile who in 1946 created a poster with a young lady bare breasts that cause a stir. Quartetto Cetra, Ornella Vanoni, Alberto Lupo, Erminio Macario and Sandra Mondaini appear in the Carosello sketches.

In the early 1960s, the company moved into a 76,000 m^{2} building on the outskirts of Alessandria. In the 1970s, Perfumery was abandoned, when it was directed more toward products for large-scale distribution.

In 2001, Paglieri founded Selectiva, owner of the Aquolina and Pink Sugar brands.

In 2007, Paglieri won the gold medal for entrepreneurial commitment and economic progress (Alessandria Chamber of Commerce).

In 2008, according to EURISPES, Paglieri was included in the Top-3 "Our Excellence" Report, one hundred success stories of the Italian System.

In 2011, the company acquired the historic pharmaceutical brand Schiapparelli.

In 2018, Paglieri won the Smau Innovation Award as an example of improving production processes and optimizing the work of operators.

In 2020, the company got recognition of Historic Brand with national interest with Felce Azzurra and Schiapparelli. In June 2022, the company finalises a change in ownership and appoints a new board of directors made up of CEOs Debora Paglieri, Fabio Rossello and Lodovico Paglieri and Ginevra Rossello Paglieri as board director, while Aldo Paglieri is non-executive chairman.

In December 2022, the company acquired Agopag, a company based in Spinetta Marengo and specialized in plastic processing.

In 2023, the Ministry of Business and Made in Italy released a series of stamps themed around “The Excellences of Production and the Economic System" to celebrate the 100th anniversary of the Felce Azzurra brand.

In 2024, Felce Azzurra was selected among the 100 representative brands of Made in Italy by the Ministry for Business and Made in Italy and included in the exhibition "Identitalia, The Iconic Italian Brands," showcased within the Ministry itself.

== Products ==
The company's personal care line includes items such as shower gels, bath foams, hand soaps, body lotions, and deodorants. In the home care category, Paglieri offers a variety of cleaning products for different surfaces and applications.

In 1976, Labrosan was born, a lip care brand. A few years later it was the turn of Cléo: for the first time in cosmetic cleansing products, a raw material of food origin, milk, was used. In 2009, Paglieri released Mon Amour, a brand dedicated to laundry products, followed in 2010 by SapoNello, dedicated to childhood.

In 1996, Paglieri launched Felce Azzurra FAN, a personal care brand. It will be followed by Il Bianco (2002), Aria di casa (2006), and Felce Azzurra Bio (2018), the certified line made by 98.8% natural ingredients.

In 2023, the new Felce Azzurra line "Fiori di Luna - Relaxing Essence" was launched, dedicated to sleep wellness. Felce Azzurra Fiori di Luna received the "Product of the Year 2024" award for the Room Diffusers category.
