= Dronero =

Dronero Draonier
- Comune
- Comune di Dronero
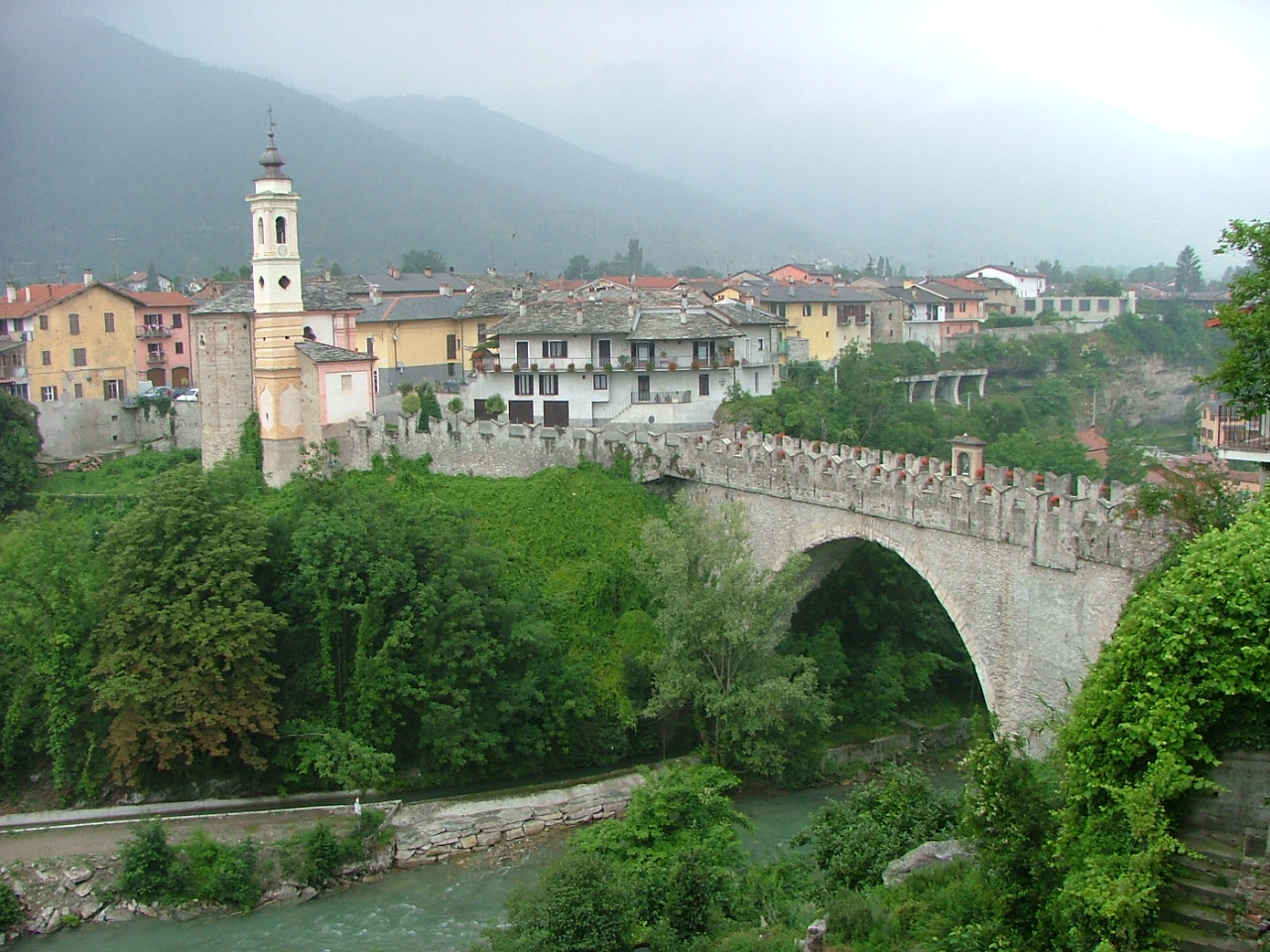
- A view of Dronero

- Coat of arms

- Location within Italy Location within Piedmont
- Coordinates: 44°28′N 7°22′E
- Country: Italy
- Region: Piedmont
- Province: Cuneo (CN)
- Frazioni: Archero, Borgata Lerda, Borgata Nuova, Borgetto, Fornace, Gangotta Sottana, Lerda, Madonna Addolorata, Monastero, Murassone Nasani, Perotti, Ponte di Bedale, Pratavecchia, Ripoli, Ruà del Prato, San Maurizio, Santa Lucia, Sant'Anna di Piossasco, Tetti

Government
  - Mayor: Mauro Astesano

Area
  - Total: 58.9 km^{2} (22.7 sq mi)
- Elevation: 622 m (2,041 ft)

Population (31 July 2017)
  - Total: 7,065
  - Density: 120/km^{2} (311/sq mi)
- Demonym: Droneresi
- Time zone: UTC+1 (CET)
  - Summer (DST): UTC+2 (CEST)
- Postal code: 12025
- Dialing code: 0171
- Patron saint: Madonna di Ripoli
- Saint day: Second Sunday in September
- Website: Official website

Dronero (Occitan: Draonier) is a comune (municipality) in the Province of Cuneo in the Italian region Piedmont, located about 70 kilometres (43 mi) southwest of Turin and about 15 kilometres (9 mi) northwest of Cuneo at the entrance of the Valle Maira.

== Main sights ==
- Ponte Vecchio, also known as Ponte del Diavolo ("Devil's Bridge")
- Torrazza, a watch tower

== Culture ==
Dronero is the home of Droneresi al Rum, a typical delicious sweet, made of two meringues and a heart of chocolate, rum and custard.
