= Valle Po =

River valley in the Cottian Alps

Coordinates: 44.6628°N 7.29615°E

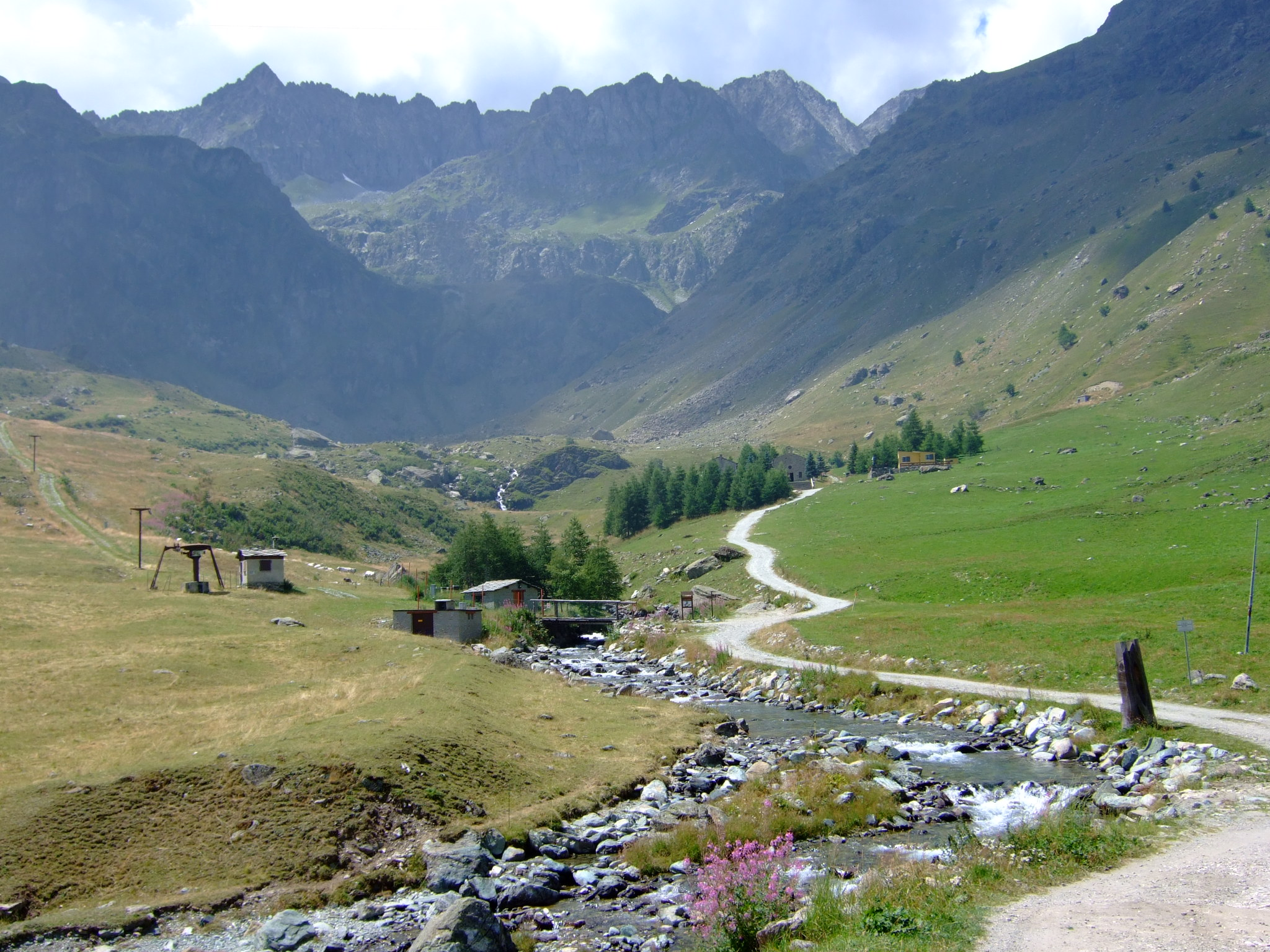
- The Po River near its source (Crissolo)

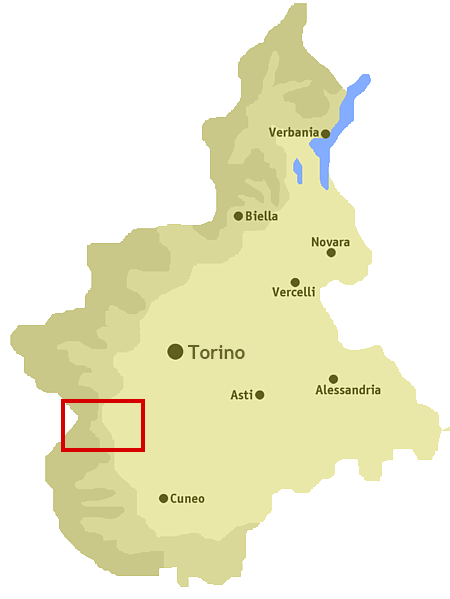
- Location in the Piedmont region

Geography
- Population centers: Crissolo, Oncino, Ostana, Paesana, Rifreddo, and Sanfront
- Rivers: Po

The Valle Po (literally "Po valley") is a valley of the Cottian Alps in the province of Cuneo, Piedmont, Northern Italy.

== Geography ==
The valley gives rise to the longest river in Italy, the Po, before it enters the Pianura Padana (or the Plain of the Po). It has a length of some 32 km, from Saluzzo to Crissolo, and is home to the Monviso mountain. It is bounded by the Val Pellice, Valle Varaita and the Valle del Guil. The head of the valley is located at the Traversette pass (Colle delle Traversette) (2950 m above sea level). The valley descends through the King's plain (Pian del Re) (2020 m), where the Po river has its source.

== See also ==
- Occitan Valleys
