= Monte Bracco =

Mountain in the Cottian Alps, Italy

- Mombracco
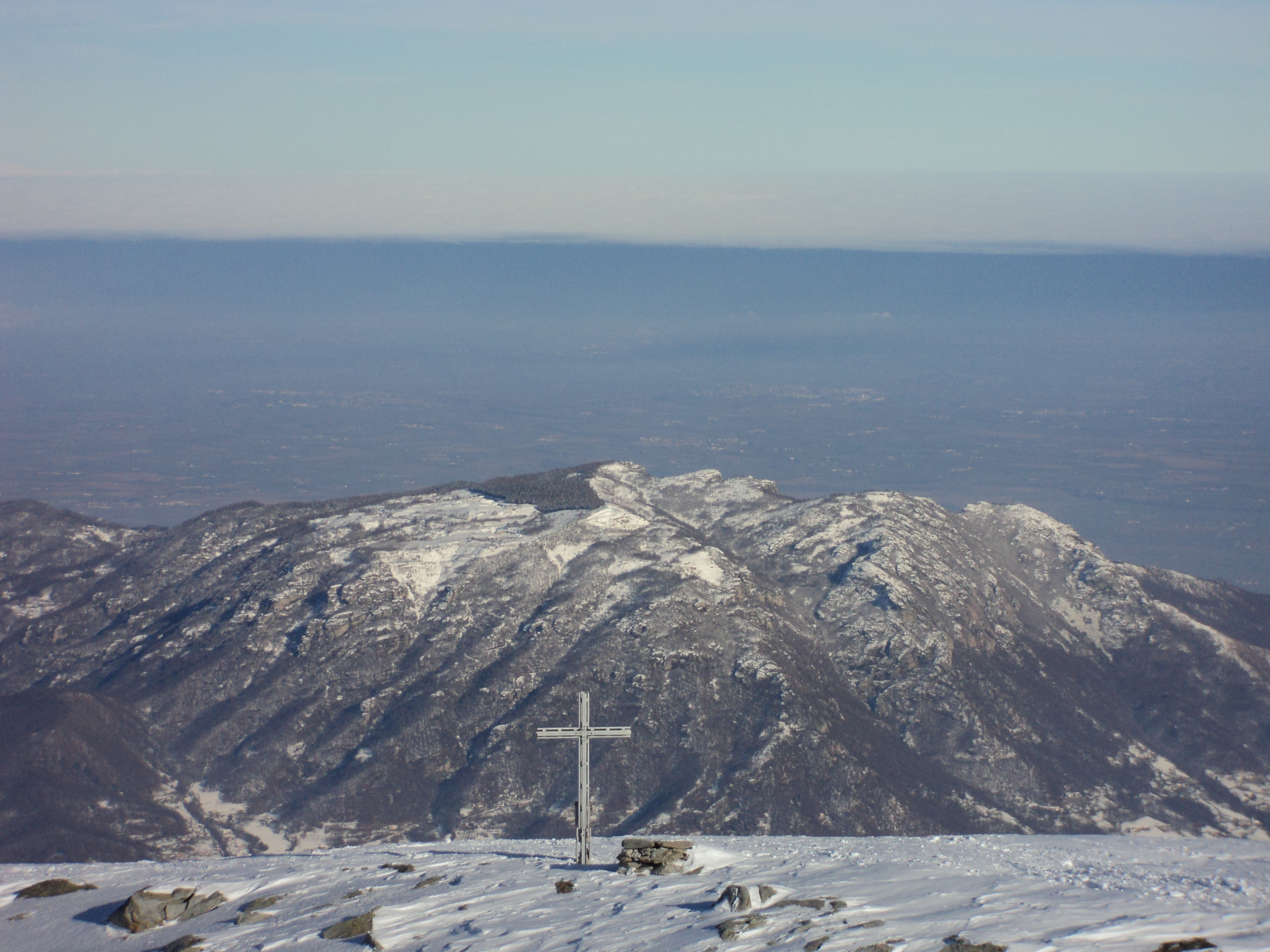
- Monte Bracco from Testa di Garitta Nuova

Highest point
- Elevation: 1,307 m (4,288 ft)
- Prominence: 694 m (2,277 ft)
- Isolation: 6.53 km (4.06 mi)
- Coordinates: 44°40′52″N 7°20′18″E

Geography
- Province: Cuneo
- Region: Piedmont
- Parent range: Alps

The Monte Bracco (though the name is sometimes shortened to Mombracco) is a mountain in the Cottian Alps with an elevation of 1,307 meters above sea level. It is located between the Valle Po, the Valle Infernotto, and the Cuneo plain.

It is situated in the Province of Cuneo, and its highest point marks the convergence of the territories of Barge, Envie, and Sanfront, although parts of its slopes belong to the municipalities of Paesana, Rifreddo, and Revello. Its name likely derives from the Celtic word brac, meaning uncultivated.

== Characteristics ==
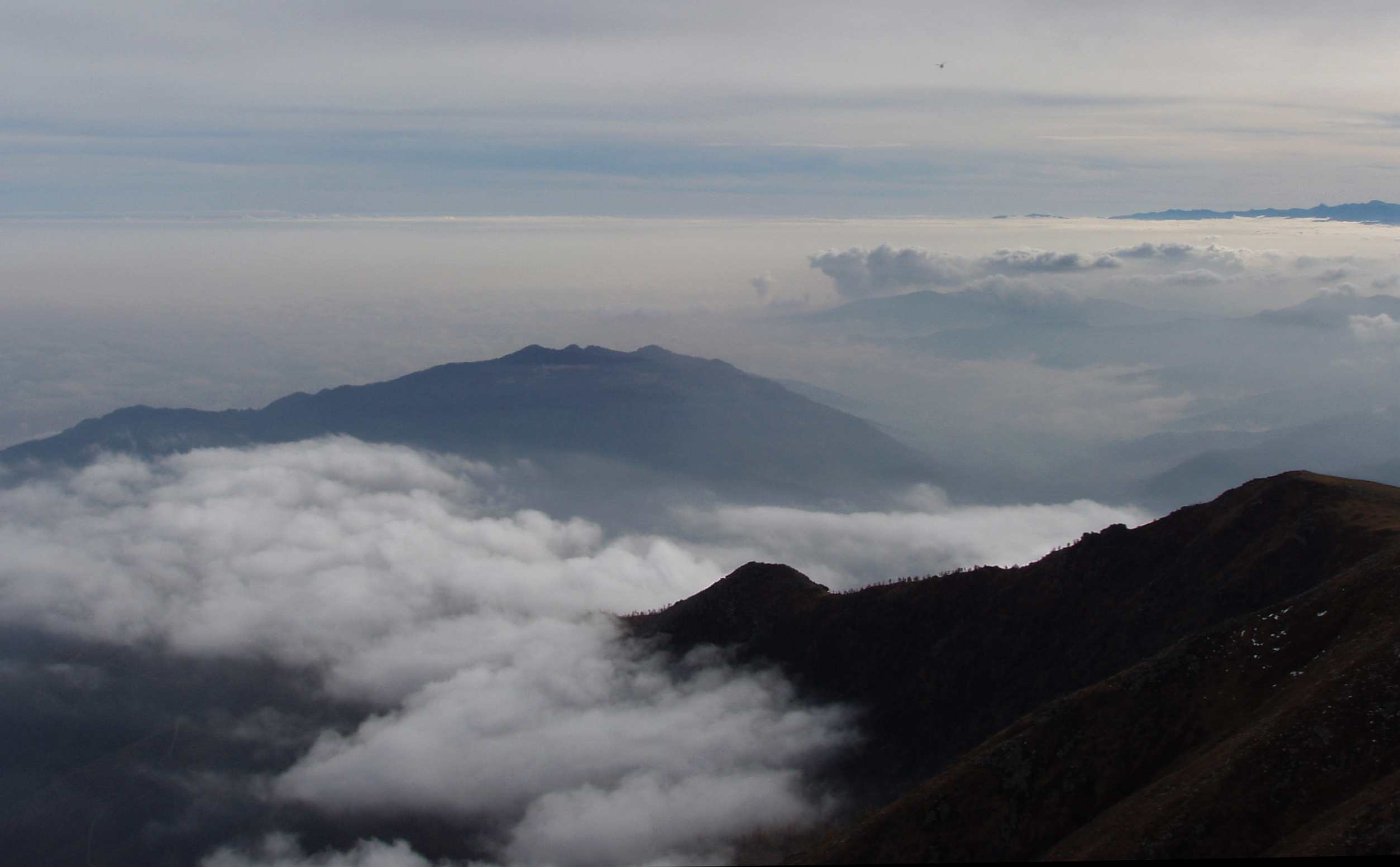
Monte Bracco from Punta Ostanetta.

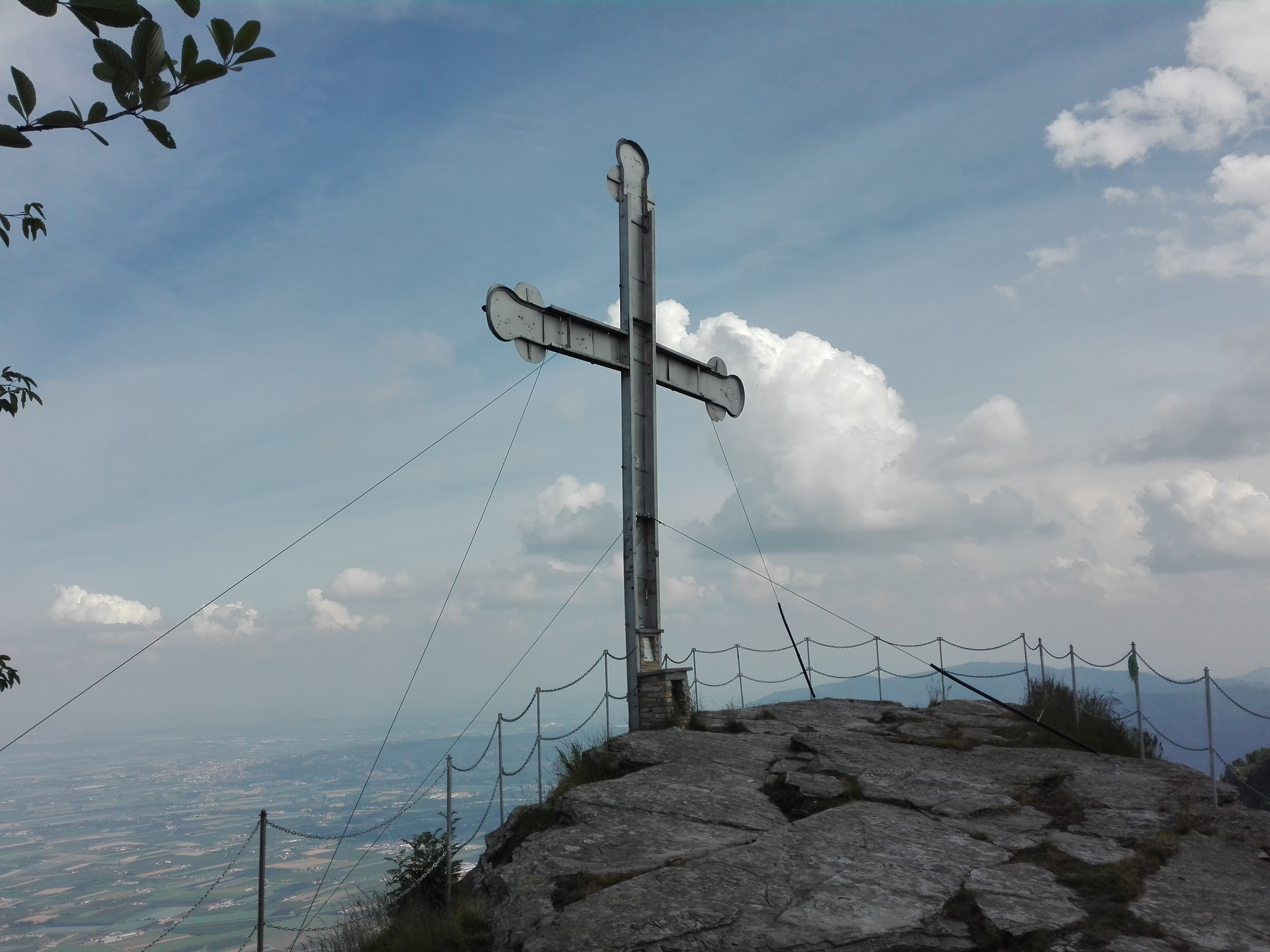
The Croce di Envie on the summit of Monte Bracco.

Rather than an isolated mountain, Monte Bracco is a small mountainous massif that extends toward the Cuneo plain and is separated from the rest of the Alpine chain by the Colletta (609 m), a low road pass connecting Barge with Paesana.

The massif rises gradually from west to east with slopes covered by meadows and woods, then drops sharply toward Envie and the plain with rocky cliffs carved by erosion gullies. The summit area includes, from north to south, a long series of elevations, including Rocca Brusà (1,101 m), Rocca dell'Oro (1,040 m), Monte Bracco proper (1,306 m), Rocca Comba di Mezzo (1,296 m), and the Croce di Rifreddo (1,209 m).

In addition to the latter, three other large crosses are present on Monte Bracco: to the southwest, the Croce di Sanfront at 1,195 m, the Croce di Envie at the highest point, and the Croce di Revello on the heights above the town. Monte Bracco is easily recognizable from a distance, and the view from the summit is vast; for these reasons, it is much loved and frequented by locals.

== Geology ==
Monte Bracco is part of the Dora-Maira crystalline complex, a vast mountainous area extending from the Val Maira to the Val Susa and culminating in the Monviso. This area, originally the seabed of the ancient Tethys Ocean, began to rise during the Devonian period due to the collision between the Eurasian and African tectonic plates, forming a large part of the western Alpine arc.

Monte Bracco represents the easternmost portion of this complex and is composed of metamorphic rocks, predominantly gneiss. These rocks are characterized by high schistosity, meaning they tend to fracture along parallel planes, and have been used since antiquity to obtain thin slabs for roofing or paving roads and buildings.

In the towns surrounding Monte Bracco, the belief persists that the mountain is a dormant volcano that could become active again in the future. This notion lacks any scientific basis and may stem from the fact that, due to its favorable exposure, snow melts earlier on the mountain, leading some to imagine a higher internal temperature and the presence of molten lava deep below.

== History ==
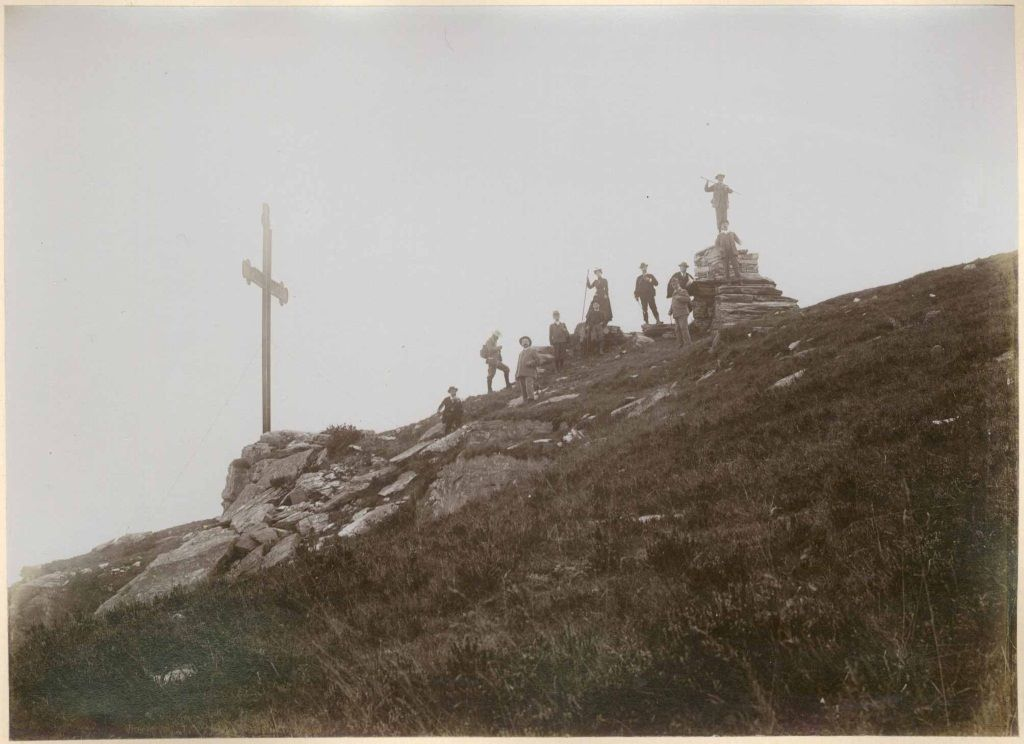
Hikers near the "Croce di Envie" (1903, photo Mario Gabinio)

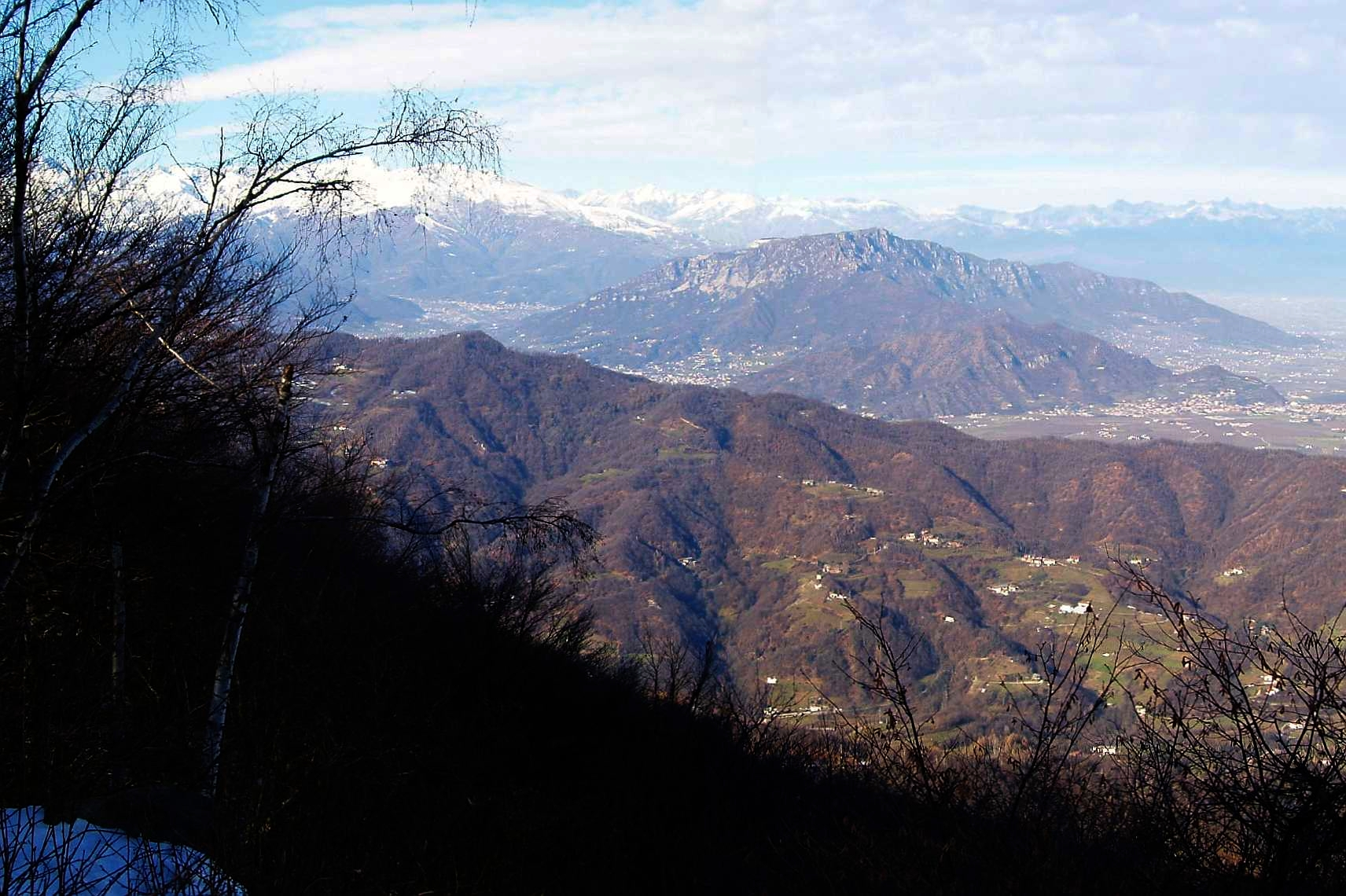
Monte Bracco from San Bernardo Vecchio (ridge between Valle Varaita-Valle Bronda)

The mountain was frequented since prehistoric times, as evidenced by numerous rock engravings found in the area; given the site’s commanding position, it is likely that some of these ancient symbols had a magical-religious significance.

Since the Middle Ages, the presence of gneiss and quartzite quarries on Monte Bracco is documented, with these stones widely used for the construction of public and private buildings in the Saluzzese area. In 1511, the Monte Bracco quarries were mentioned by Leonardo da Vinci in a manuscript now preserved in Paris at the National Archives (manuscript B): Monbracho sopra saluzo sopra la certosa un miglio a piè di Monviso a una miniera di pietra faldata la quale e biancha come marmo di carrara senza machule che è della dureza del porfido......

From the second half of the 20th century, quarrying of gneiss ceased, while quartzite extraction remains active. The stone extracted, called Bargiolina, is still widely used in Piedmont.

Several notable historical architectural remnants are present on Monte Bracco, including the Balma Boves, a curious rural complex built under a rocky overhang at 652 m in the municipality of Sanfront, and the medieval Convento della Trappa, between Envie and Barge.

== Hiking and mountaineering ==
Monte Bracco is primarily of interest for hiking, with many routes accessible on foot, by mountain bike, or with snowshoes, allowing exploration of its historical and environmental aspects.

Of particular note is the Giro del Bracco, a circular hiking route that encircles the entire massif and covers more than 20 km.

On the slope facing the plain, numerous climbing routes have been established, some of which are considered highly challenging.
