= Cardè Bridge =

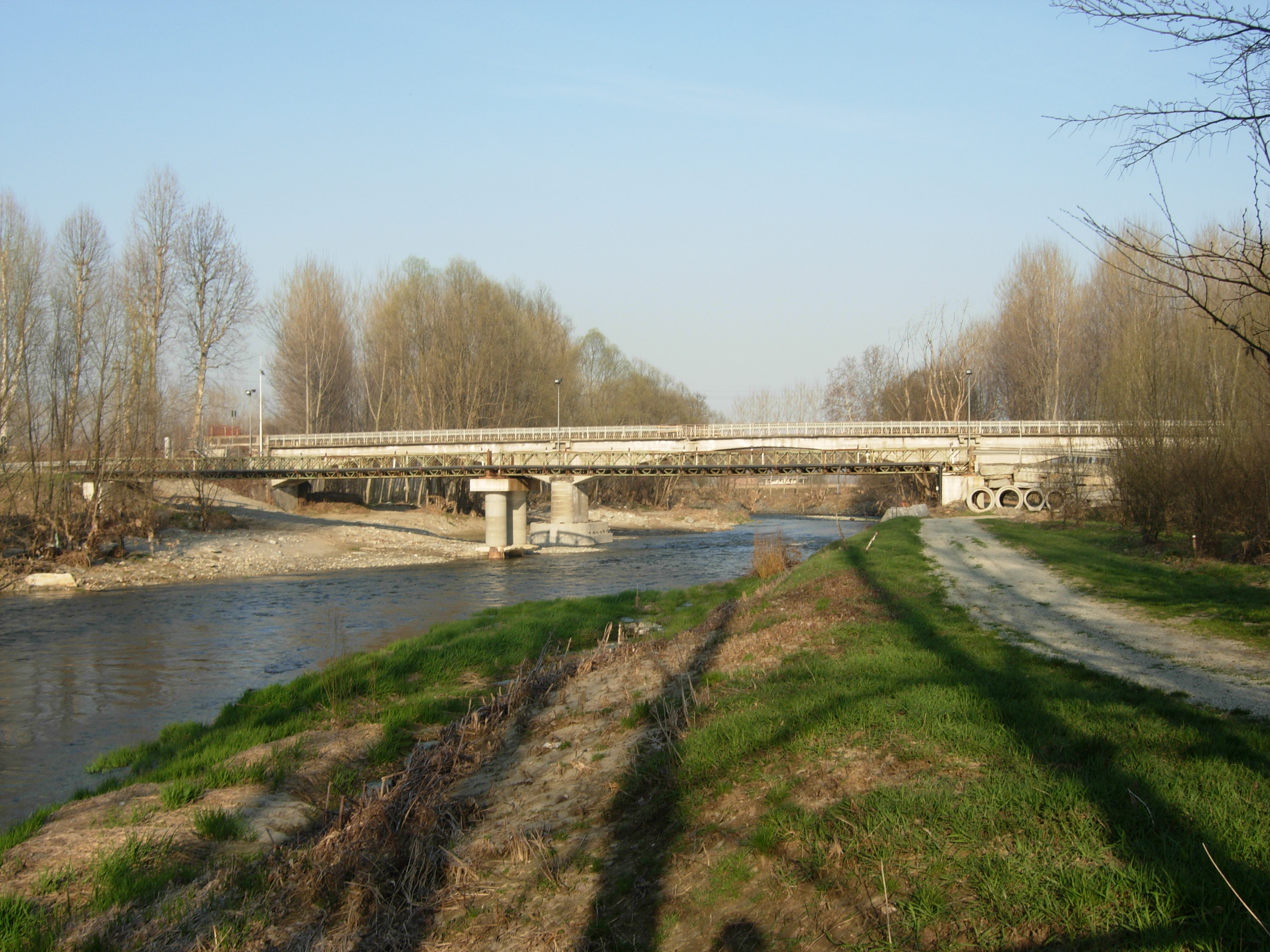
- Cardè Bridge in March 2009
- Coordinates: 44.74786°N 7.47834°E
- Carries: Motor vehicles, pedestrians, and bicycles
- Crosses: Po
- Locale: Cardè
- Official name: Ponte di Cardè
- Other name(s): Pont ëd Cardè
- Maintained by: Province of Cuneo

Characteristics
- Design: Concrete
- Total length: 328 Feet
- Width: 14 Feet
- Longest span: 105 Feet
- No. of spans: 3

History
- Designer: Giay Bros.
- Construction start: 5 February 1914
- Construction end: 7 December 1914
- Opened: 19 September 1919
- Closed: 9 February 2004

Statistics
- Toll: Free both ways

== History ==
The Cardè Bridge is the first reinforced concrete bridge built over the Po. It is located in Cardè, in the Province of Cuneo, in the Italian region Piedmont. The works for its realization started on 5 February and finished on 7 December 1914. The project was planned by Ingegneri Giay Emilio & Eugenio of Turin. Before its construction, a wooden bridge linked Cardè to Villafranca Piemonte and Barge but it was often ruined by the floods. On 9 February 2004, during the central pillar maintenance works, the bridge subsided. Nowaday the structure is condemned, moreover the works for its restoration are going on. Meanwhile, a Bailey bridge was built to let the vehicles but trucks pass.

== Gallery ==
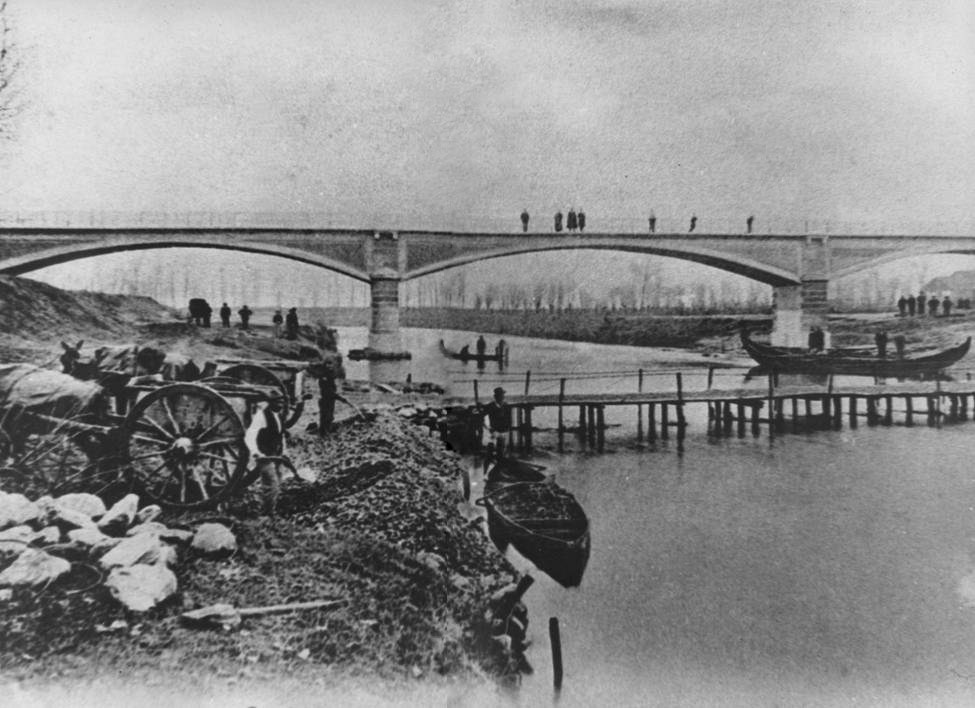
Crossing the Po in 1914.

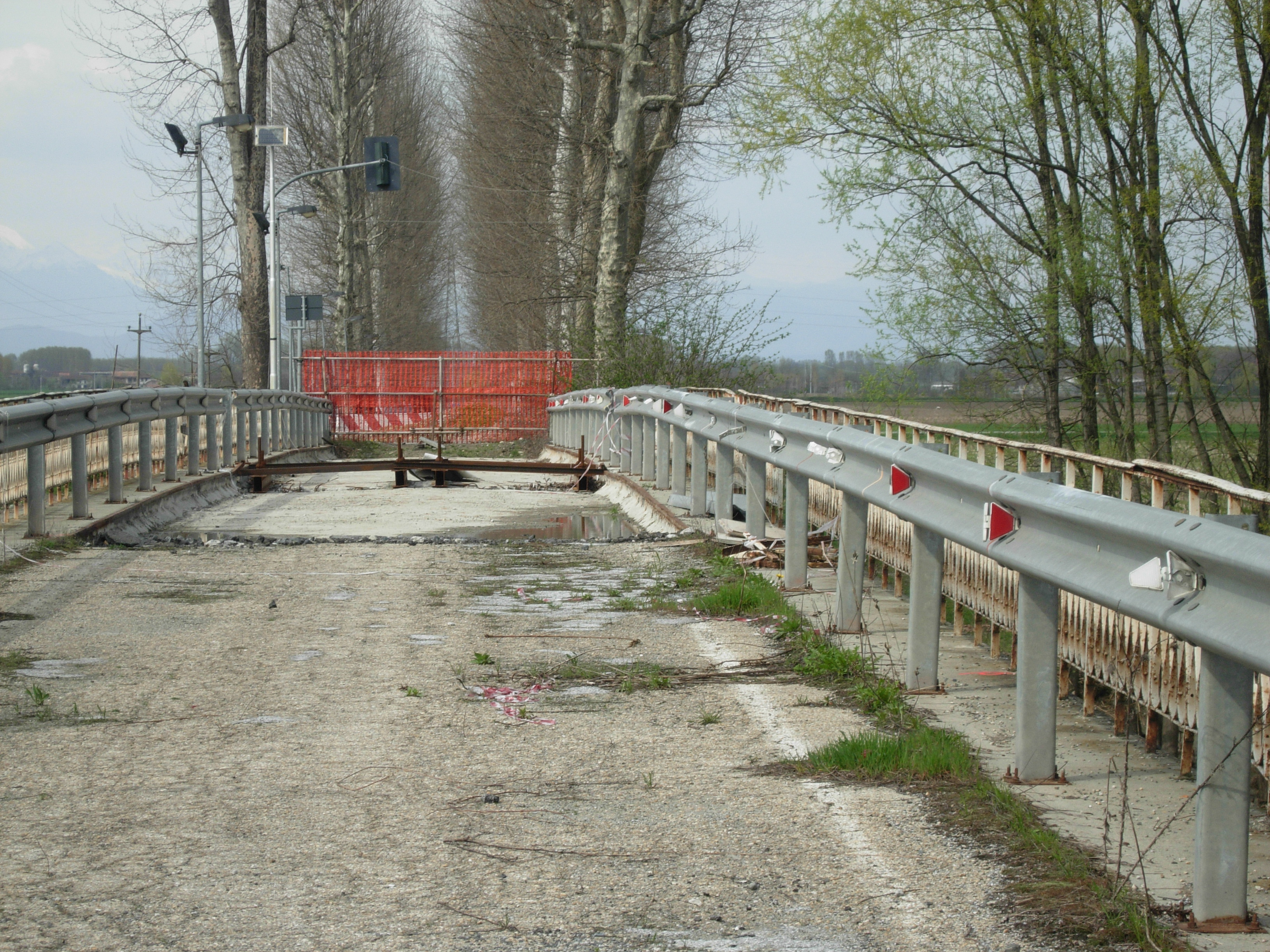
Work in progress in 2009.

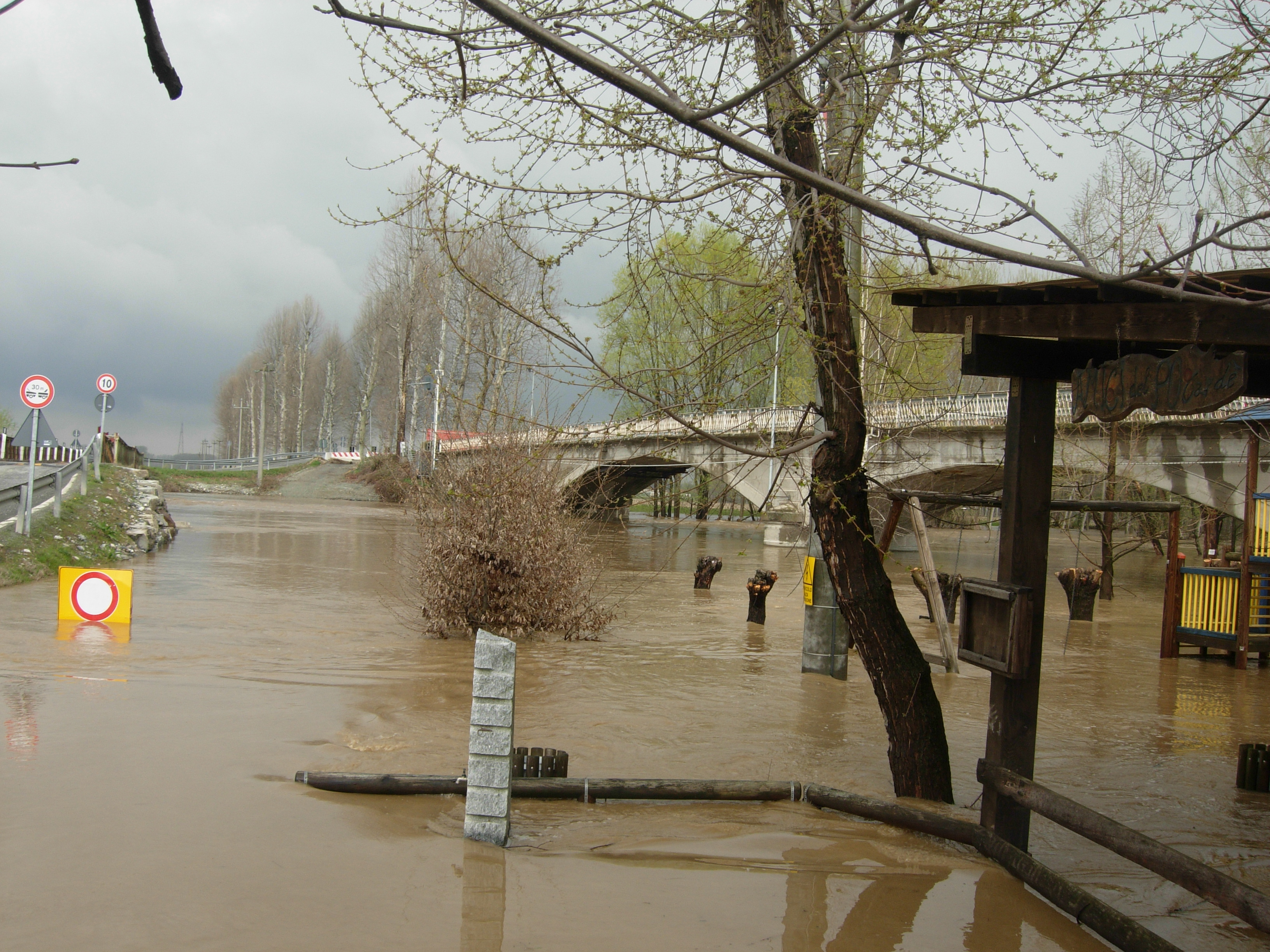
The bridge during a flood.
