= Po Valley =

Plain in northern Italy

Coordinates: 45°19′49″N 9°47′56″E

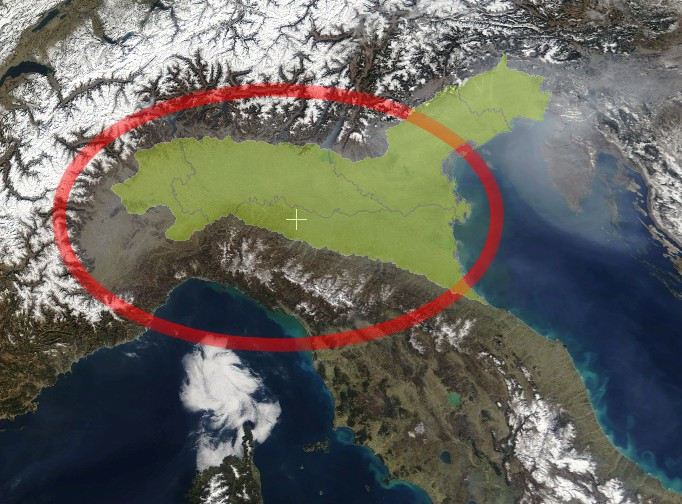
The Padan Plain in northern Italy (green) and the Po basin in the Plain (red circle)

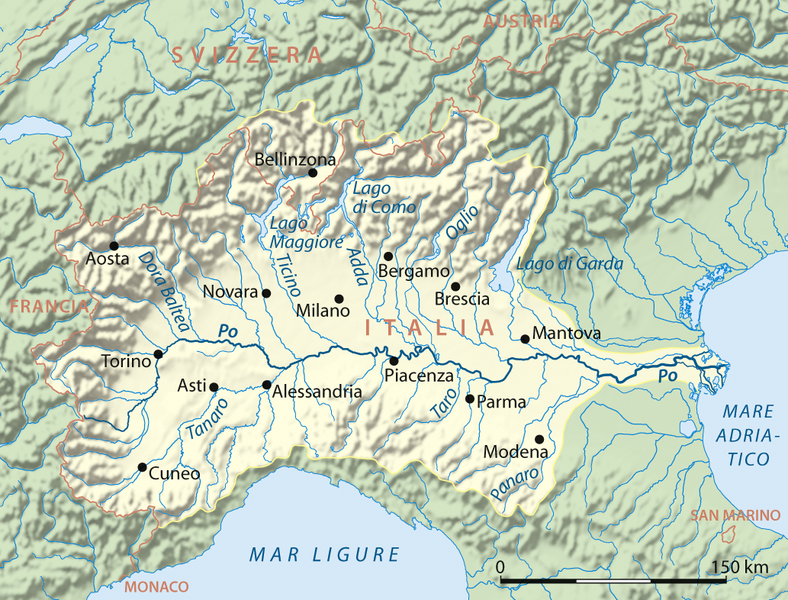
Map showing the Po and tributaries in the Padan Plain. Note the numerous Italian Lakes on the margin of the Alps.

The Po Valley, Po Plain, Plain of the Po, or Padan Plain (Italian: Pianura Padana, pronounced [pjaˈnuːra paˈdaːna], or Val Padana) is a major geographical feature of northern Italy. It extends approximately 650 km (400 mi) in an east-west direction, with an area of 46,000 km^{2} (18,000 square miles) including its Venetic extension not actually related to the Po basin; it runs from the Western Alps to the Adriatic Sea. The flatlands of Veneto and Friuli are often considered apart since they do not drain into the Po, but they effectively combine into an unbroken plain, making it the largest in Southern Europe. It has a population of 17 million, or a third of Italy's total population.

The plain is the surface of an in-filled system of ancient canyons (the "Apennine Foredeep") extending from the Apennines in the south to the Alps in the north, including the northern Adriatic. In addition to the Po and its affluents, the contemporary surface may be considered to include the Savio, Lamone and Reno to the south, and the Adige, Brenta, Piave and Tagliamento of the Venetian Plain to the north, among the many streams that empty into the north Adriatic from the west and north.

Geo-political definitions of the valley depend on the defining authority. The Po Basin Water Board (Autorità di bacino del fiume Po), authorized in 1989 by Law no. 183/89 to oversee "protection of lands, water rehabilitation, the use and management of hydro resources for the national economic and social development, and protection of related environment" within the Po basin, has authority in several administrative regions of north Italy, including the plain north of the Adriatic and the territory south of the lower Po, as shown in the regional depiction included with this article. The law defines the Po basin as "the territory from which rainwater or snow and glacier melt flows on the surface, gathers in streams of water either directly or via tributaries...". The United Nations Environment Program includes the Alps and Apennines as far as the sources of the tributaries of the Po but excludes Veneto and that portion of Emilia-Romagna south of the lower Po; that is, it includes the region drained by the Po but only the Po and its tributaries.

The altitude of the valley through which the Po flows, exclusive of its tributaries, varies from approximately 4 m (15 feet) below sea level in the Polesine subregion (the delta around Ferrara) to about 2,100 m (6,900 feet) at the river's origin in the southern Piedmontese province of Cuneo, also known as the Provincia granda. The valley is crossed by a number of affluents running down from the Alps in the north and from the Apennines in the south. The Po's major affluents include the Tanaro, Scrivia, Trebbia, Panaro and Secchia in the south, Dora Riparia, Dora Baltea, Sesia, Ticino (draining Lake Maggiore), Lambro, Adda (draining Lake Como), Oglio (draining Lake Iseo) and Mincio (draining Lake Garda and called Sarca in its upper reaches) in the north.

== Geology ==
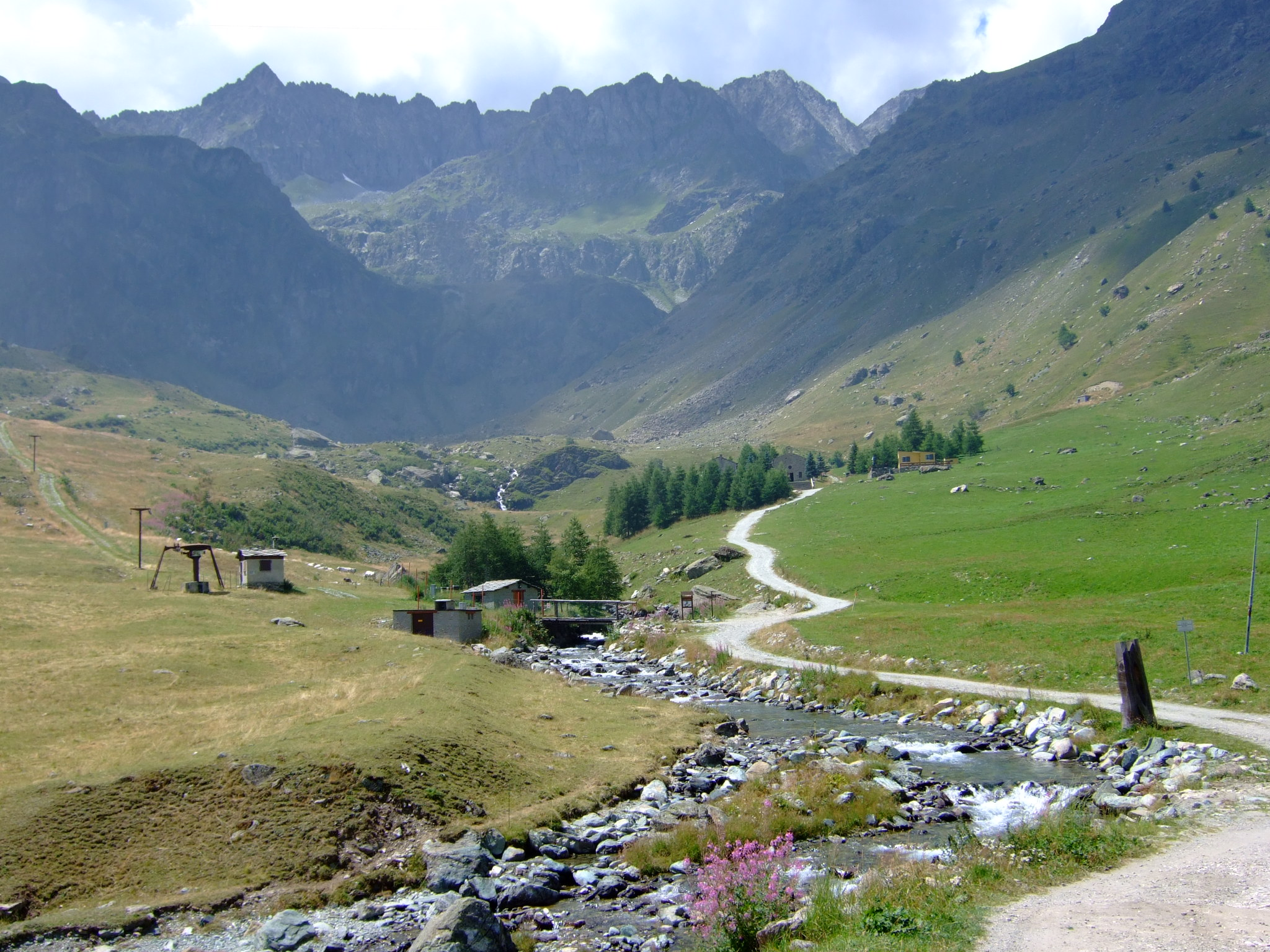
Po near source in the Western Alps

The Po Valley and the Adriatic overlay a foreland basin and a system of deeply buried ancient canyons surviving from the tectonic collision of an offshore land mass, Tyrrhenis, with the mainland, an incident within the collision of the African and Eurasian plates. Since the Messinian (7–5 mya) the system has been filling with sediment mainly from the older Apennines but also from the Alps. The shoreline of the Adriatic depends on a balance between the sedimentation rate and isostatic factors. Until about 1950, the Po delta was prograding into the Adriatic. After that time due to human alteration of geologic factors, such as the sedimentation rate, the delta has been degrading and the coastline subsiding, resulting in ongoing contemporaneous crises in the city of Venice.

The Malossa gas condensate field was discovered in 1973 and produces at depths of 6 km (4 miles) from the Upper Triassic Dolomia Principale dolomite and the Lower Jurassic Zandobbio dolomite, capped by the Lower Cretaceous Marne di Bruntino marl.

== Geography ==
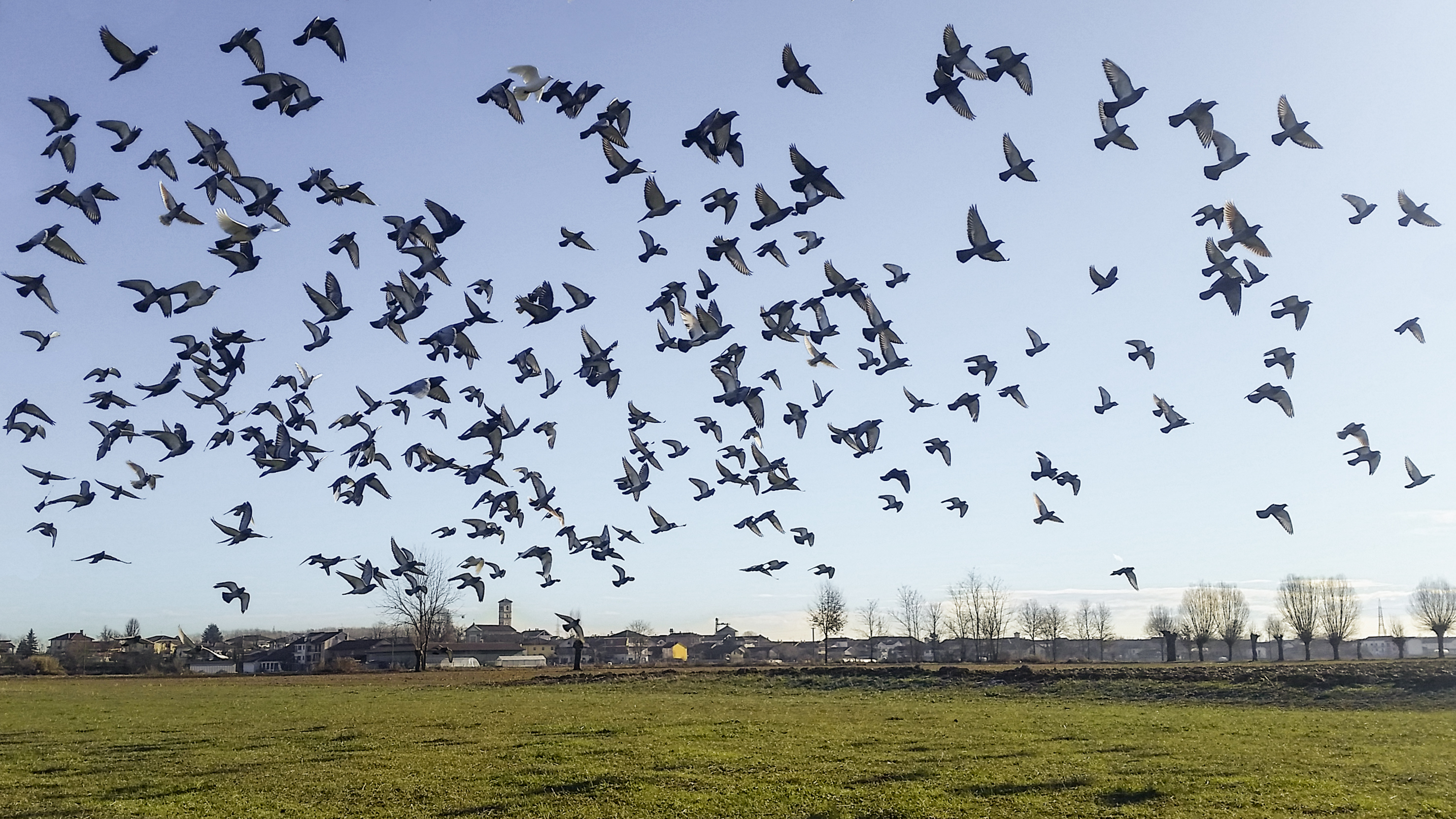
Carmagnola, countryside near the Po

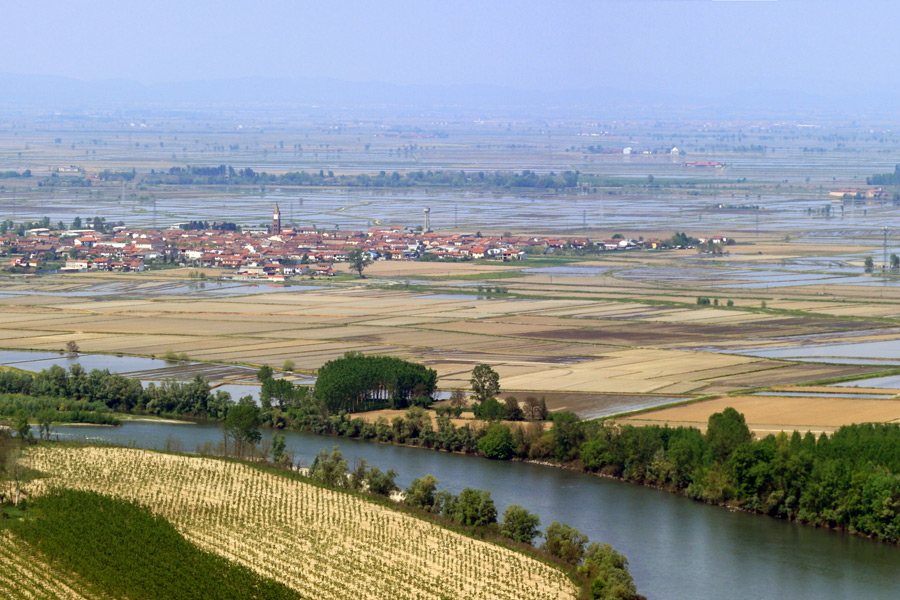
Rice fields in the province of Vercelli, eastern Piedmont

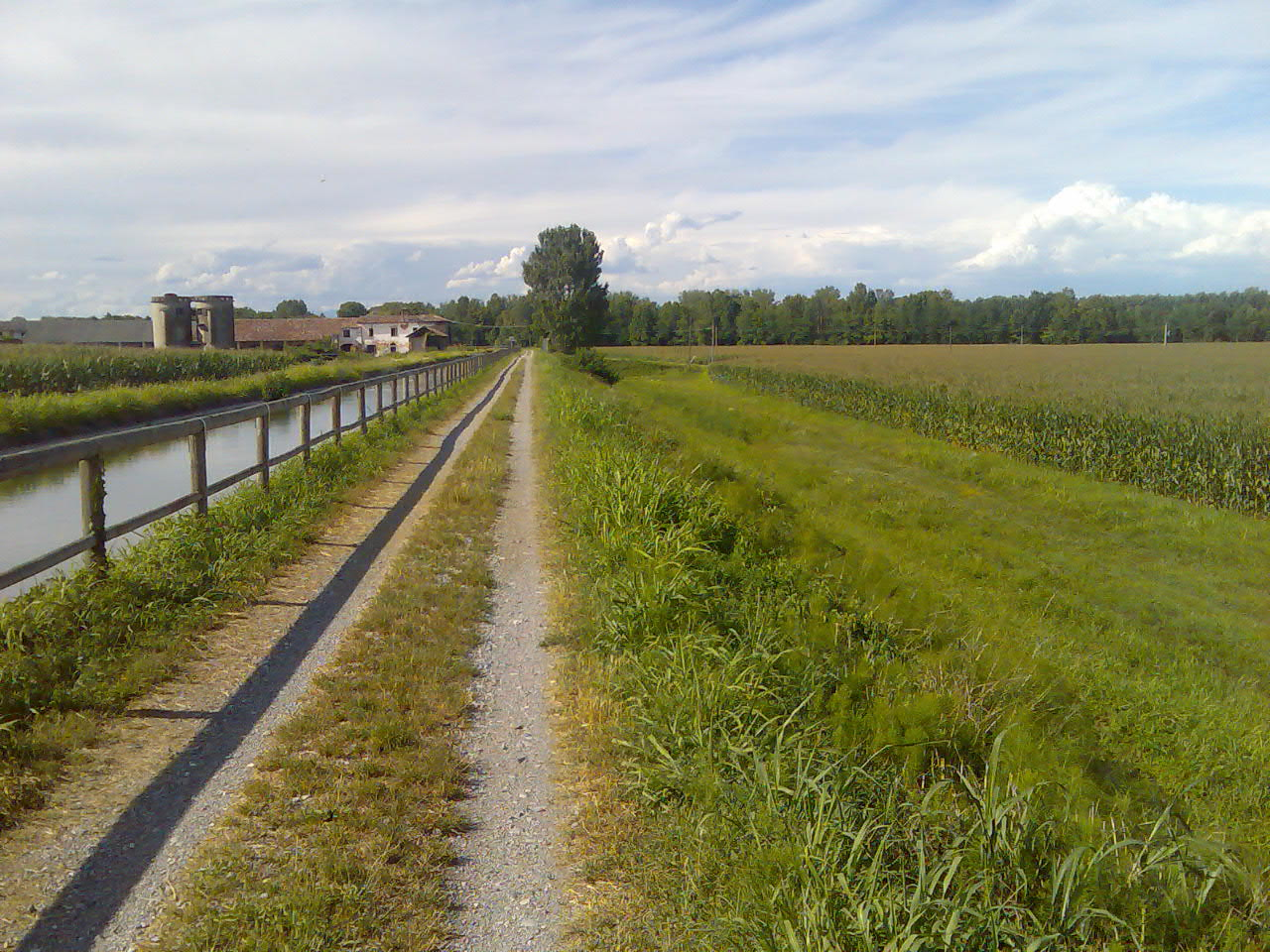
Landscape of the Bassa: a farm in the province of Cremona, southern Lombardy

The Po Valley is often regarded as a syncline, or dip in the crust due to compression at the edges. Regardless of whether this concept accurately describes its geology, the valley is manifestly a sediment-filled trough, or virtual syncline, continuous with the deeps of the Adriatic Sea. The surface terrain is therefore divided into two overall types of landform: the plain, or flat surface of the fill, and the anticline at the edges, taking the form of hilly country in which the outcrops of the original rock are visible along with alluvial fans formed from the outwash of the more severe anticlinal terrain; that is, the Apennines and the Alps.

The valley is broadly divided into an upper, drier part, often not particularly suited for agriculture, and a lower, very fertile, and well-irrigated section, known in Lombardy and western Emilia as la Bassa, 'the low (plain)'. The upper areas of the Po valley take local names which reflect in their meanings their being modestly suited for farming. So we have the Piedmontese vaude and baragge, the Lombard brughiere and Groane, or, exiting from the Po valley proper, the Friulian magredi, areas remote from easily reachable water tables and covered with dense woods or dry soils.

This specific meaning for 'lower plain' derive from a geologic feature called the fontanili line or zone, a band of springs around the Val Po, heaviest on the north, on the lowermost slopes of the anticline. It varies from a few kilometres to as much as 50 km (30 miles) wide. The fontanili line is the outcrop, or intersection, of the anticline's water table with the surface at the edge of the bassa. The rock above the line is porous. Surface water in the intermittent streams of the mountains tends to disappear below ground only to spring out again in the spring zone. The spring zone is often called "the middle valley."

Surface runoff water (the Po and its affluents) is not of much value to the valley's dense population for drinking and other immediate uses, being unreliable, often destructive, and heavily polluted by sewage and fertilizers. Its main anthropic value is for hydro-electric power, irrigation, and industrial transport. The cost of purifying it for human consumption makes that process less feasible. The fresh drinking water comes from hundreds of thousands of wells concentrated especially in the fontanili zone. The major settlements, therefore, are also in that zone, which has become the centre of economic development and industry in Italy, and now is an almost continuous megalopolis stretching from Turin to Trieste.

The bassa Padana was settled and farmed earliest, in Etruscan and Roman times. After the collapse of the Roman Empire (5th century AD), lack of maintenance of the irrigation systems associated with a cooling climate phase (i.e. the so-called Migration Period or The Dark Age Cold Period) led to the progressive waterlogging of the Po Valley and the natural depressions on the right side of the Po turned in vast swamp basins. The waterlogging process of the area continued until the 10th-century influencing the human sustenance and settling practices. According to historical-archaeological data, indeed, the wetlands were exploited for fishing as well as for transport by boat while the early medieval sites settled on the fluvial ridges, in topographically higher and strategic position in the surrounding swampy meadows.

The Po Valley has been completely turned to agriculture since the Middle Ages, when efforts from monastic orders, feudal lords and free communes converged. The older and smaller cities deriving from ancient times are still located there.

According to historical maps and documents the land reclamation of the Po Valley reached its peak during the Renaissance (15th–16th centuries) and continued in the Modern Age (17th–18th centuries), with the last marsh areas only being reclaimed in the 20th century: channels and drainage system are still active and allow the Po Valley to be drained and be cultivatable.

== Major cities ==
The regions of Italy as defined by the government of Italy. According to the Po Basin Water Board, the valley includes: 14) Piedmont, 2) Aosta Valley, 11) Lombardy, 20) Veneto, 10) Liguria, 7) Emilia-Romagna, 17) Trentino-Alto Adige, and 8) Friuli-Venezia Giulia.

From upstream to downstream:

=== Piedmont ===
- Paesana
- Sanfront
- Martiniana Po
- Villafranca Piemonte
- Turin
- Chivasso
- Casale Monferrato
- Valenza

=== Lombardy and Emilia-Romagna ===
- Pavia
- Piacenza
- Cremona
- Casalmaggiore
- Ferrara

=== Veneto ===
- Po Delta – where the river flows into the Adriatic Sea

== Climate and vegetation ==
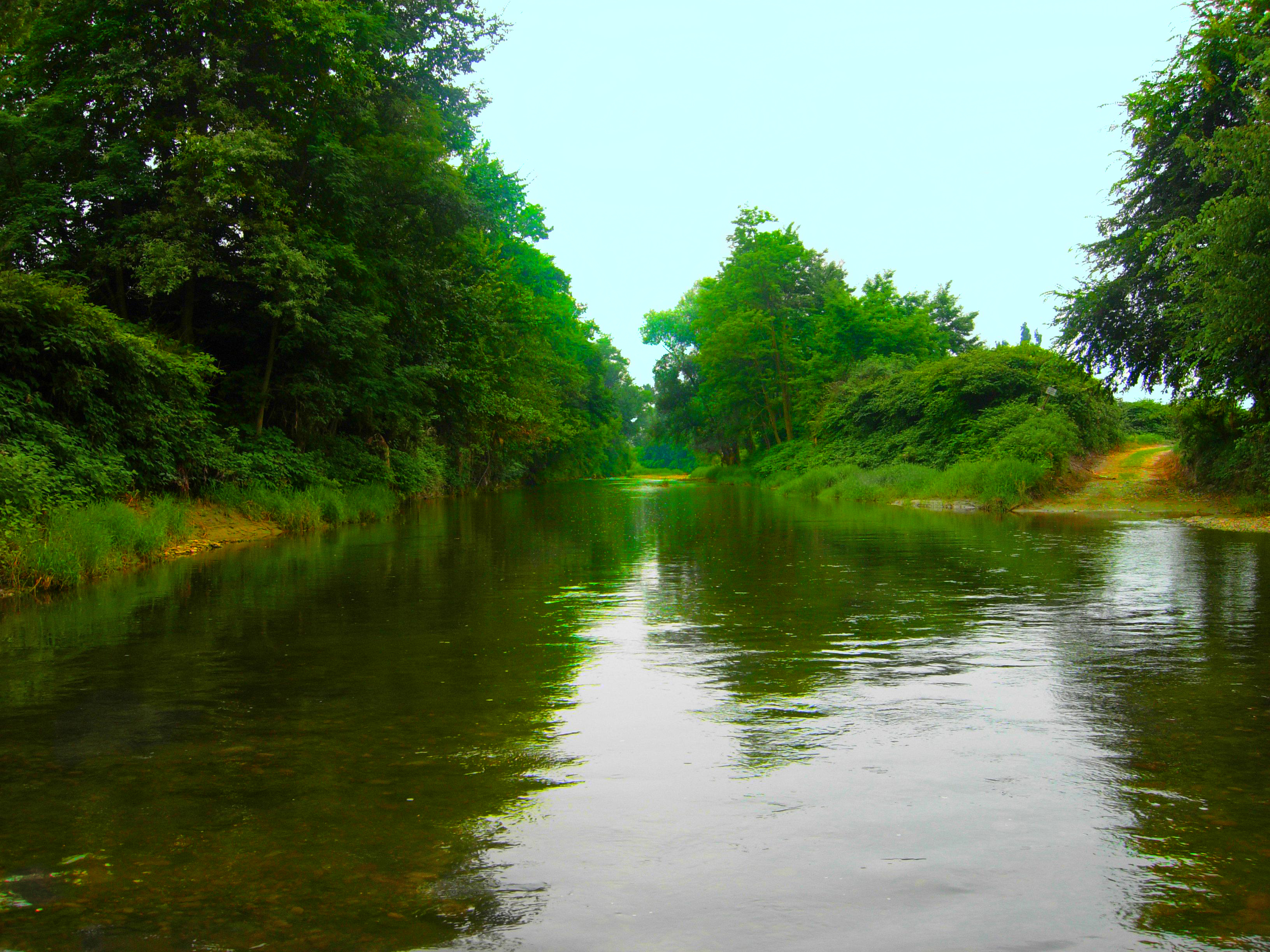
Natural vegetation (central-European broadleaved trees) of the Padan Plain

The Po Valley has a generally humid subtropical (Köppen: Cfa) climate. The conformation of the plain, surrounded by the Alps and the Apennines, and the influence of the Adriatic Sea cause high levels of relative humidity throughout the year. The climate is increasingly warmer and more humid farther south and east.

Winters are cool and damp, with January mean temperatures ranging between 0 and 5 °C (32 and 41 °F). Fog and mist are frequent, although the urban heat effect, decreased air pollution and climate change have made winters less foggy and cold than before. Snow and winter droughts can deny sufficient moisture to the soil for agriculture. Summers are hot and humid, with July mean temperatures ranging between 22 and 25 °C (72 and 77 °F) (1971–2000 averages). Frequent thunderstorms and sudden hailstorms can produce large hail, dump large quantities of rain, and destroy crops. Supercell thunderstorms produce large hail, with significant agricultural costs. Tornadoes are common in the plains of the valley. The Friuli-Venezia Giulia, beyond the Po plain itself, is downwind of the mountains and upwind of moisture sources from nearby is an exception. Spring and autumn are well-marked and pleasant. Both winter and summer are less mild in the lower parts along the Po, while the Adriatic Sea and the great lakes moderate the local climate in their proximity.

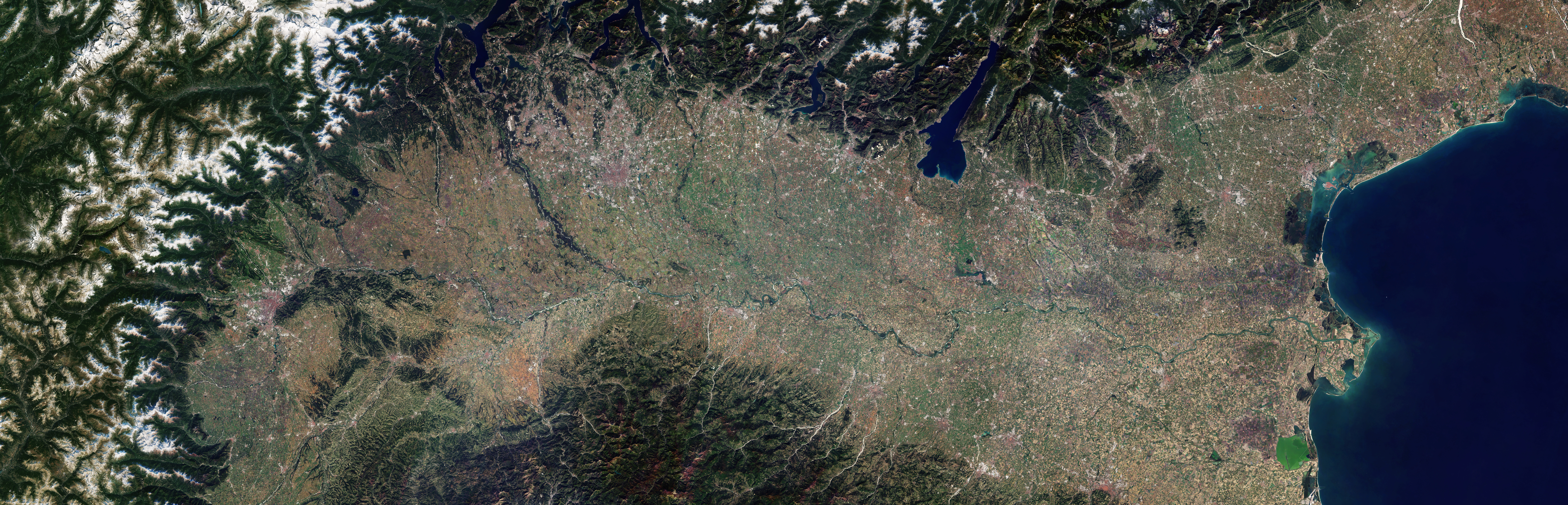
The Po Valley as seen by the ESA's Sentinel-2

Rainfall varies between 700 and 1,200 mm (30 and 45 inches) and equally distributed during the year. Rainfall maximums are during autumn and spring. Winds are usually weak, although sudden bursts of foehn or thunderstorms can sweep the air clean. The almost enclosed nature of the Padan basin with much road traffic, makes it prone to a high level of pollution in winter, when cold air clings to the soil. The natural potential vegetation of the Po basin is a mixed broadleaf forest of pedunculate oak, poplars, European hornbeam, alders, elderberry, elms, willows, maples, ash, and other central-European trees. The largest remaining fragments of forest are located around the River Ticino and are protected by a Biosphere Reserve.

== History ==
=== Prehistory and antiquity ===
The Po Valley has had traces of inhabitation since at least 780,000 years ago, when the first big glaciation of pleistocene took place. Sites such as Monte Poggiolo may have served as refuges of human populations fleeing the terribly cold conditions of Northern Europe during the subsequent glaciations along pleistocene. The valley was covered by sea level in warm times, but glaciations could cause a lower sea level that allowed big mammals and humans to migrate from Africa and the Middle East to central and Western Europe through an empty and open Po valley, avoiding the barrier of the Alps, reaching the Loire Valley, and Iberian Peninsula, and then, when glaciation retreated, the rest of continental Europe.

Urban development began in the Po Valley much later than in southern Italy or Greece. The first known ancient inhabitants of the thick forests and swamps were the Ligurians, who may have been an Indo-European people. After the progressive immigration in the 7th century BC of Celtic peoples known as the Insubres (hence the name of Insubria sometimes being given to northwestern Lombardy), the southern and central regions were conquered and colonised here and there by a pre-Indo-European people, the Etruscans, who left names such as Parma, Ravenna and Felsina, the ancient name of Bologna. The Etruscan domination left significant marks and introduced urban civilisation, but was short-lived. Its inhabitants, the Venetics, probably being a distinct group who, being skillful merchants, were, in time, also culturally influenced by both Etruscans and Greeks. By 500 BC the Etruscans were gradually displaced from the region by migrating Gauls.

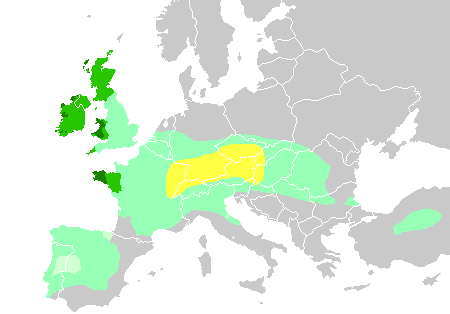
Diachronic distribution of Celtic peoples: Core Hallstatt territory, by the 6th century BCE Maximal Celtic expansion, by 275 BCE Lusitanian area of Iberia where Celtic presence is uncertain The "six Celtic nations" which retained significant numbers of Celtic speakers into the Early Modern period Areas where Celtic languages remain widely spoken today

=== Middle Ages ===
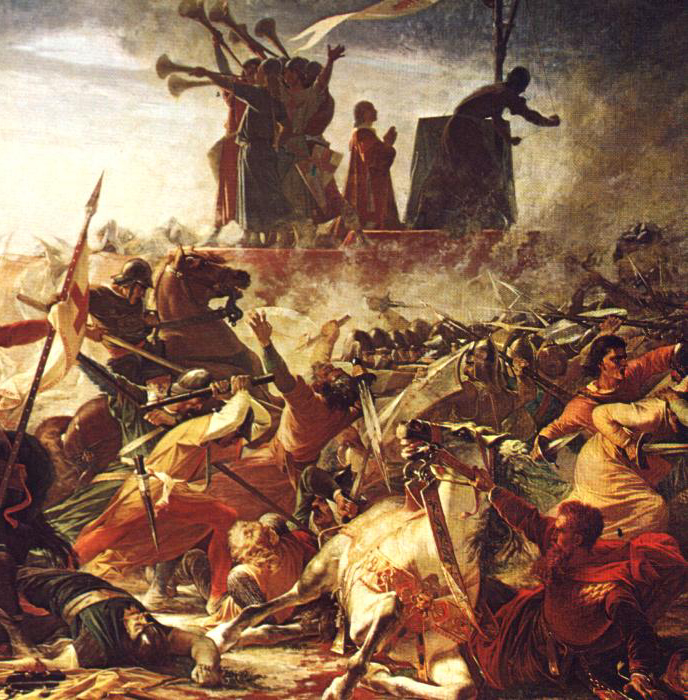
The defence of the Carroccio during the battle of Legnano (1176) by Amos Cassioli (1832–1891)

Once the long Pax Romana showed signs of weakening, and after enduring the passage of several Germanic invaders, and even that of Attila and his Huns, the Po valley was to find no peace. The Gothic War and Justinian's plague devastated the Padan population. In this scenario of desolation, from which many people had fled to the mountains for safety (making them fairly populated till the 20th century) came the Germanic Lombards, a warrior people who gave their name to almost the whole of the Po valley: Lombardy. In the Middle Ages the term was used to indicate all of northern Italy. The Lombards divided their domain in duchies, often contending for the throne; Turin and Friuli, in the extreme west and east end respectively, seem to have been the most powerful, whereas the capital soon shifted from Verona to Pavia. Monza also was an important town in that time, more so than ruined Milan. The Lombards' harsh, caste-like rule over the natives softened somewhat with their conversion from Arianism to Catholicism.

The Lombard kingdom was overthrown in 774 by Charlemagne and his Frankish armies, becoming a prized part of the Carolingian Empire, forming the kingdom of Italy, always with its capital in Pavia. The affirmation of large landownership from the eighth/ninth centuries accelerated the process of land reclamation and intensified land use, transforming the landscape of the Po Valley. After the chaotic feudal dissolution of the empire and much fighting among pretenders to the imperial crown, Otto I of Saxony set the stage for the following phase of the region's history by adding the Po Valley to the Holy Roman Empire of the Germanic nation in 962. In Veneto, the lagoon capital of Venice, emerged a great sea power in alliance with its old master, the Byzantine Empire. In time the Comuni emerged, as towns thrived in commerce. Soon Milan became the most powerful city of the central plain of Lombardy proper, and despite being razed in 1162, it was a Milan-driven Lombard League with Papal benediction that defeated emperor Frederick Barbarossa at the Battle of Legnano in 1176.

Between the 10th and 13th centuries, concurrent with the Medieval Warm Period climate phase, the European population grew substantially, almost tripling (in northern and central Italy, the urban population doubled), and increasing the demand for cultivated lands. Cereals became a more significant constituent in the average diet and in the agrarian regime compared to the centuries before, leading populations to reconfigure the medieval natural landscape for agricultural purposes. In creating new land for cultivation and settlement, the European communities triggered a massive landscape transformation through woodland clearance, arable intensification, the development of irrigation systems and the drainage of wetlands. Land reclamations works profoundly modified many European regions. In central Po Plain the earliest evidence of attempts to clear the forests and drain the wetlands is mentioned in historical documents from the late 8th century, but only from the 10th to 13th centuries were land and water management activities actually carried out widely.

== Economy ==
The Po Valley is one of the most important industrial and agricultural areas in Europe. Hydroelectricity is produced by the flow of the Po. The river is extensively used for irrigation for the region's agriculture.

== Pollution ==
Po Valley is considered the worst area in Europe for air quality. In March 2019, the European Space Agency (ESA) published images of nitrogen dioxide concentrations taken from the Sentinel-5P satellite. These images show a big red area, made of nitrogen dioxide and fine particles, situated above the Po Valley area, which incorporates the city of Milan, Turin, and Bologna. Milan and Turin share high levels of ozone and nitrogen oxides, which are mainly produced by cars' diesel and petrol engines. To shed light on the danger of humans living in polluted environments, the Chicago Energy Policy Institute developed the Air Quality Life Index (AQLI), a system capable of analyzing air pollution worldwide. According to AQLI findings, Po Valley air pollution affects inhabitants to the extent that it cuts off about half a year of their life expectancy. The main reasons for the high amount of air pollution over the Po Valley are strictly connected to livestock and factories. The so-called "NPK fertilizers", made of nitrogen, phosphorus and potassium, along with manure emissions from intensive breeding and high levels of nitrogen dioxide released by diesel and petrol engines are all accountable for this disastrous air condition in northern Italy. The region of Lombardy produces also vast amounts of animal waste, a big contributor to pollution. It delivers more than 40 percent of Italy's milk production, for example, while over half of the Italian pig production is located in the Po Valley.

According to research published in The Lancet Planetary Health in January 2021, which estimates the death rate associated with fine particulate matter (PM_{2.5}) and nitrogen dioxide (NO_{2}) pollution in 1000 European cities, Brescia and Bergamo in Lombardy have the highest death rate from fine particulate matter (PM_{2.5}) in Europe. Vicenza (Veneto) and Saronno (Lombardy) are in fourth and eighth place, respectively, in a top ten of ten cities. Turin and Milan are also at the top of the European ranking—3rd and 5th respectively—in terms of increased mortality from nitrogen dioxide, a gas that is produced mainly from traffic and in particular from diesel vehicles, while Verona, Treviso, Padua, Como and Venice rank eleventh, fourteenth, fifteenth, seventeenth and twenty-third respectively.

The data show that many cities in the Po Valley suffer the most serious impact at European level due to poor air quality, first of all the metropolitan area of Milan, thirteenth in the ranking in terms of fine particulate impact, where any year 3967 premature deaths occur—approximately 9% of the total.
