= Premio Ostana =

The Ostana Prize – Writings in the Mother Tongue (Italian: Ostana Premio Scritture in Lingua Madre), is an annual prize and cultural initiative organized by the Municipality of Ostana and by the Cultural Association Chambra d'Oc. It is dedicated to languages and to literary authors who use a "mother tongue", a present-day minority language of territorial belonging, in their works. The event began in 2008 and is held in Ostana, a municipality in the Valle Po (Italy), every year at the beginning of June. It is open to the public with free admission.

== Categories of Ostana Prize ==
Every year, the Ostana Prize assigns prizes to authors selected all over the world according to different categories, some of which were added only in the recent editions: International Award, National Award, Award for the Occitan language, Young Writers Award, Special Award, Translation Award, Award for Musical Composition, Film Award.

For the International Award and the National Award the organizers select authors who have used in their works, in whole or in part, one of the minority languages recognized at national and international level.

Because of the geographical location of Ostana Prize in the Occitan Area (the municipality of Ostana is in fact part of the Occitan minority area in Italy) an author writing in the language is given a specific recognition.

The Special Award is conferred to an author who is particularly distinguished in the defence, promotion and dissemination of a minority language in danger of extinction.

The Translation Award is awarded to an author who has achieved distinction in the translation of writings to, or from, a minority language.

The Young Writers Award is given to an under-40 author who has achieved distinction in the field of literature and who is engaged in the promotion of his or her mother tongue.

In the 2016 edition, two awards to artistic career were added: The Award for Musical Composition which is awarded to an author who has been noteworthy in the field of composition in his or her native language, and The Film Award which is given to a filmmaker who made a cinematographic work in a minority language.

== Duration of award ceremony ==
The Ostana Prize – Writings in Mother Tongue has a duration of three days during which the winning authors are invited by the organizers to reside in Ostana, in one of the existing facilities, and to take part in meetings, debates, video projections, readings in minority languages, musical and artistic performances, photographic exhibitions, etc.. On the last day of the event, the prizes to the individual authors are delivered.

=== The symbols of the Ostana Prize ===
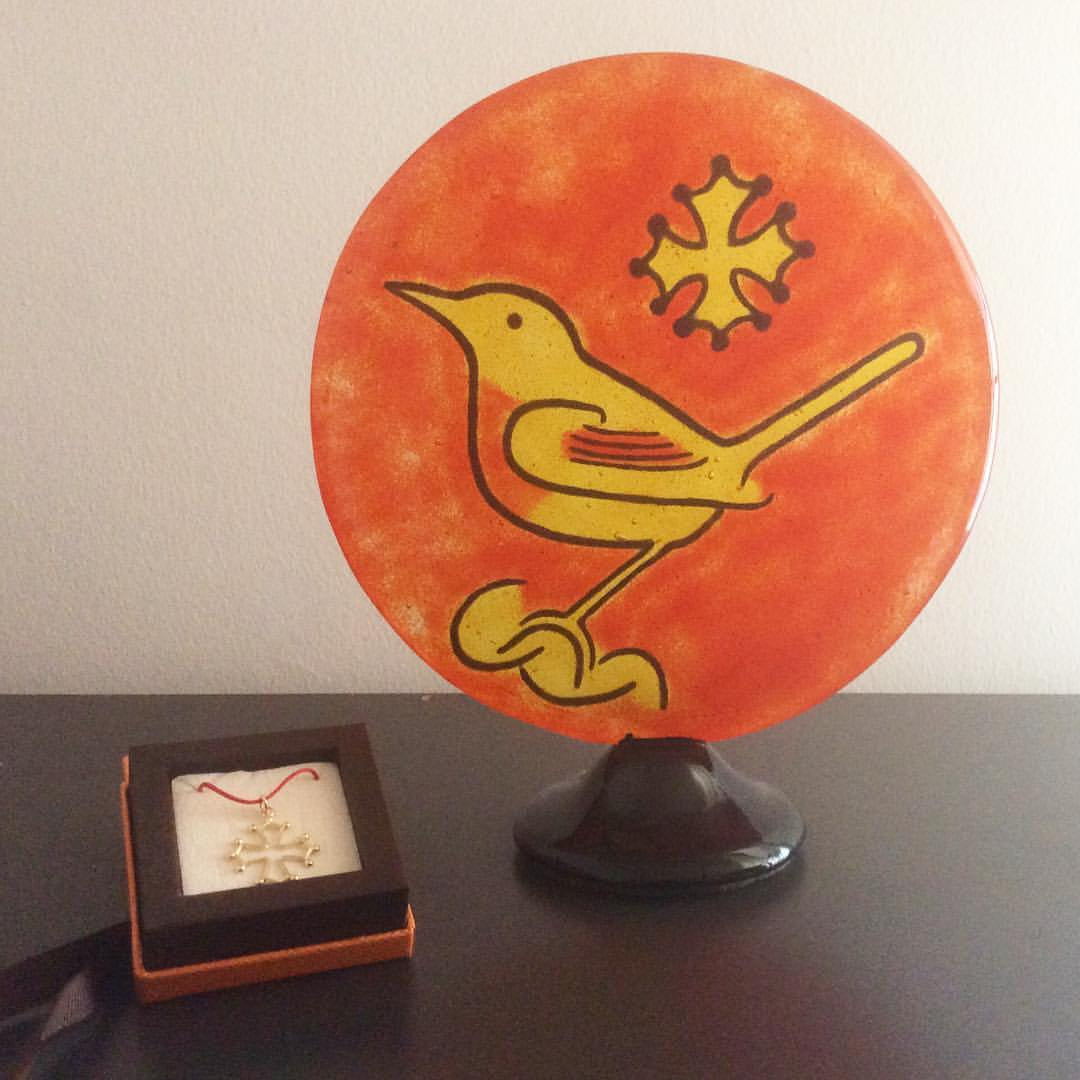
The Ostana Prize, a glass sculpture representing the nightingale, symbol of Occitania, and a gold medal with the Occitan cross, created by Silvio Vigliaturo, contemporary Italian artist and glass sculptor.

The prize consists of: a glass sculpture, specially created by the Italian artist Silvio Vigliaturo with the illustration of a nightingale, symbol of Occitan culture (in reference to the song "Se chanta"), accompanied by a gold medal created by Marco Gioielli which represents the Occitan cross.

=== Objectives ===
The objectives of the Ostana Prize are:

- celebrating and bringing together authors (writers, poets, musicians, filmmakers, translators) who contribute to the promotion of enduring and emerging languages with their work,
- listening and making the public aware of the sound of endangered, yet eager-to-live, languages, in order to discover through these languages the histories and cultures of the people who speak them,
- highlighting the value of multilingualism through the live testimonies of authors and artists from around the world.

=== The Writers ===
In the eight years of activity of the Award 48 writers have been invited; among those 8 were Occitan. The remaining 40 represented different languages.

=== The languages ===
The Ostana Prize has been awarded to representatives of minority languages such as: Friulian language, Slovene language, Cimbrian language, Ladin language, Armenian language, Sardinian language, Standard Tibetan, Basque language, Romani language, Totonacan languages, Catalan language, Huave language, Breton language, Sami languages, Hebrew language, Maltese language, Corsican language, Cheyenne language, Kurdish languages, Māori language, Galician language, Shuar language, Yoruba language, Frisian languages, Griko dialect e Occitan language.

== Award winners ==
=== edition 1, year 2008 ===
22–23 November

- Max Roqueta language: Occitan, Special Award
- Alfredo Conde language: Galician, International Award
- Carlo Sgorlon language: Friulian, National Award

=== edition 2, year 2010 ===
19–20 June

- Gavino Ledda language: Sardinian, Special Award
- Witi Ihimaera language: Māori, International Award
- Boris Pahor language: Slovene, National Award
- Ives Roqueta language: Occitan, Award for the Occitan language
- Constantino Canales language: Huave, Young Writers Award
- Arturo Viano language: Occitan, Translation Award

=== edition 3, year 2011 ===
3–5 June

- Vincenzo Consolo language: Sicilian, Special Award
- Harkaitz Cano language: Basque, International Award
- Andrea Nicolussi Gold language: Cimbrian, National Award
- Aurélia Lassaque language: Occitan, Award for the Occitan language
- Tuntiak Katan language: Shuar, Young Writers Award
- Reuven Miran language: Hebrew, Translation Award

=== edition 4, year 2012 ===
2–3 June

- Sergio Salvi, writer, Special Award
- Kerttu Vuolab language: Sami, International Award
- Joseph Zoderer language: German, National Award
- Serge Bec language: Occitan, Award for the Occitan language
- Maite Brazales language: Catalan, Young Writers Award
- Diegu Corràine language: Sardinian, Translation Award

=== edition 5, year 2013 ===
1–2 June

- Chenreb Gyamtso, known as Nodreng language: Tibetan, Special Award
- Mehmet Altun language: Kurdish, International Award
- Rut Bernardi language: Ladin, National Award
- Jean Rouquette language: Occitan, Award for the Occitan language
- Antony Heulin language: Breton, Young Writers Award
- Francesco Ferrucci language: Catalan, Translation Award

=== edition 6, year 2014 ===
31 May – 2 June

- Marcel Courthiade language: Romani, Special Award
- Lance David Henson language: Cheyenne, International Award
- Franco Marchetta language: Friulian, National Award
- Danielle Julien language: Occitan, Award for the Occitan language
- Arno Camenisch language: Romansh, Young Writers Award
- Anthony Aquilina language: Maltese, Translation Award

=== edition 7, year 2015 ===
30 May – 2 June

- Jun Tiburcio Perez Gonzales (Jun Tiburcio) language: Totonacan, Special Award
- Jacques Thiers language: Corsican, International Award
- Antonia Arslan language: Armenian, National Award
- James Thomas language: Occitan, Award for the Occitan language
- Niillas Holmberg language: Sami, Young Writers Award
- Clive Boutle Translation Award

=== edition 8, year 2016 ===
2–5 June

- Kola Tubosun language: Yoruba, Special Award
- María Clara Sharupi Jua language: Shuar, International Award
- Salvatore Tommasi language: Griko, National Award
- Joan Ganhaire language: Occitan, Award for the Occitan language
- Tsead Bruinja language: West Frisian, Young Writers Award
- Lurdes Auzmendi language: Basque, Translation Award

==== Awards to artistic career ====
- Rocco De Santis language: Griko, Award for Musical Composition
- Renato Morelli Film Award

=== edition 9, year 2017 ===
- Salem Zenia language: Amazigh-Kabyle, Special Award
- Joséphine Bacon language :Innu, International Award
- Francesco Severini language: linguistic minorities of Italy, National Award
- Roland Pecout language: Occitan, Award for the Occitan language
- Erlend O. Nodtvedt language: Nynorsk, Giovani Award
- Gwyn Griffiths language: Welsh, Translation Award

==== Awards to artistic career ====
- Mans De Breish language: Award for Musical Composition in the Occitan language
- Samir Aït Belkacem language: Kabyle, Film award

=== edition 10, year 2018 ===
- Bob Holman, a celebratory prize of the decennial
- Juan Gregorio Regino, Special Award
- Adil Olluri, International Award
- Tatjana Rojc, Minority award for historical language of Italy.
- Matieu Poitavin, Occitan Language Award
- Doireann Ní Ghríofa, Giovani Award
- Aleksej Leontiev, Translation Award
- Joan Isaac, Prize for Musical Composition
- Asier Altuna, Cinema Award

=== edition 11, year 2019 ===
- Tilbert Dídac Stegmann, Special prize (Learning Romance, Slavic, Germanic languages through the EuroComRom method - The Seven Sieves - Germany)
- Manuel Rivas, International award Galician language (Spain)
- Anna Maria Bacher, Historical linguistic minorities prize in Italy Walser language (Italy)
- Gérard Zuchetto, Occitan language Award Occitan language (France)
- Dariia "Neseni" Martynova, Youth Award Lingua even (Siberia, Russia)
- Craig Patterson, Galician Language Translation Prize (Spain)
- Franca Masu, Music composition award, Catalan language of Alghero (Italy)
- Marcelo Martinessi, Cinema award, Guarani language (Paraguay)

=== edition 12 (2020) and edition 13 (2021) ===
Both editions were held without awardees because of the COVID-19 pandemic.

=== edition 14, 2022 ===
- Diego Marani (Europanto language-game) - Special Prize
- Francho Nagore Laín (Aragonese language – Spain) - International Prize
- Rosalba Perini (Friulan language) - Historic Linguistic Minorities Award in Italy
- Bhuchung D. Sonamm (Tibetan language – Nepal) - Youth Award
- Stefania Maria Ciminelli (Catalan language – Spain) - Translation Award
- Paulina Kamakine (Occitan language – France) - Occitan language award
- Marine Lavigne (Breton language – France) - Music Composition Award
- Fredo Valla (Occitan language – Italy) - Cinema award.

=== edition 15, year 2023 ===
23 June – 25 June

- Hawad (Air Tamajeq language) - Special Prize
- Bernardo Atxaga (Basque language) - International Prize
- Blanca Fernández Quintana (Asturian language) - Youth Award
- Julie Perreard (Corsican language) - Cinema Award
- Fiona J. Mackenzie (Scottish Gaelic) - Music Composition Award
- Monica Longobardi (Occitan language) - Translation Award
- Sara Laurens (Occitan language) - Occitan language award
- Liliana Bertolo Boniface (Franco-Provençal) - Historic Linguistic Minorities Award in Italy

=== edition 16, year 2024 ===
28 June – 30 June

- Koumarami Karama (Dioula language) - Special Prize
- Firat Cewerî (Kurdish language) - International Prize
- Daniel Petrilă (Romani language) - Youth Award
- Roger Williams (Welsh language) - Cinema Award
- Arnold de Boer "Zea (band)" (Frisian language) - Music Composition Award
- Jayde Will (Latgalian language) - Translation Award
- Michèla Stenta (Occitan language) - Occitan language Award
- Stefan Dell’Antonio Monech (Ladin language) - Historic Linguistic Minorities Award in Italy

=== edition 17, year 2025 ===
27 June – 29 June

- Kristian Braz (Breton language) - Special Prize
- Soulama Maténé Martine "Téné Tina" (Cerma language) - International Prize
- Berta Dávila (Galician language) - Youth Award
- Mano Khalil (Kurdish language) - Cinema Award
- Olga Marie Sohantenaina "Olga of Madagascar" (Malagasy Tsimihety language) - Music Composition Award
- Éamon Ó Ciosáin (Irish language) - Translation Award
- Estelle Ceccarini (Occitan language) - Occitan language Award
- Francesca Sammartino (Croatian language) - Historic Linguistic Minorities Award in Italy
