= Salem Zenia =

Kabyle writer

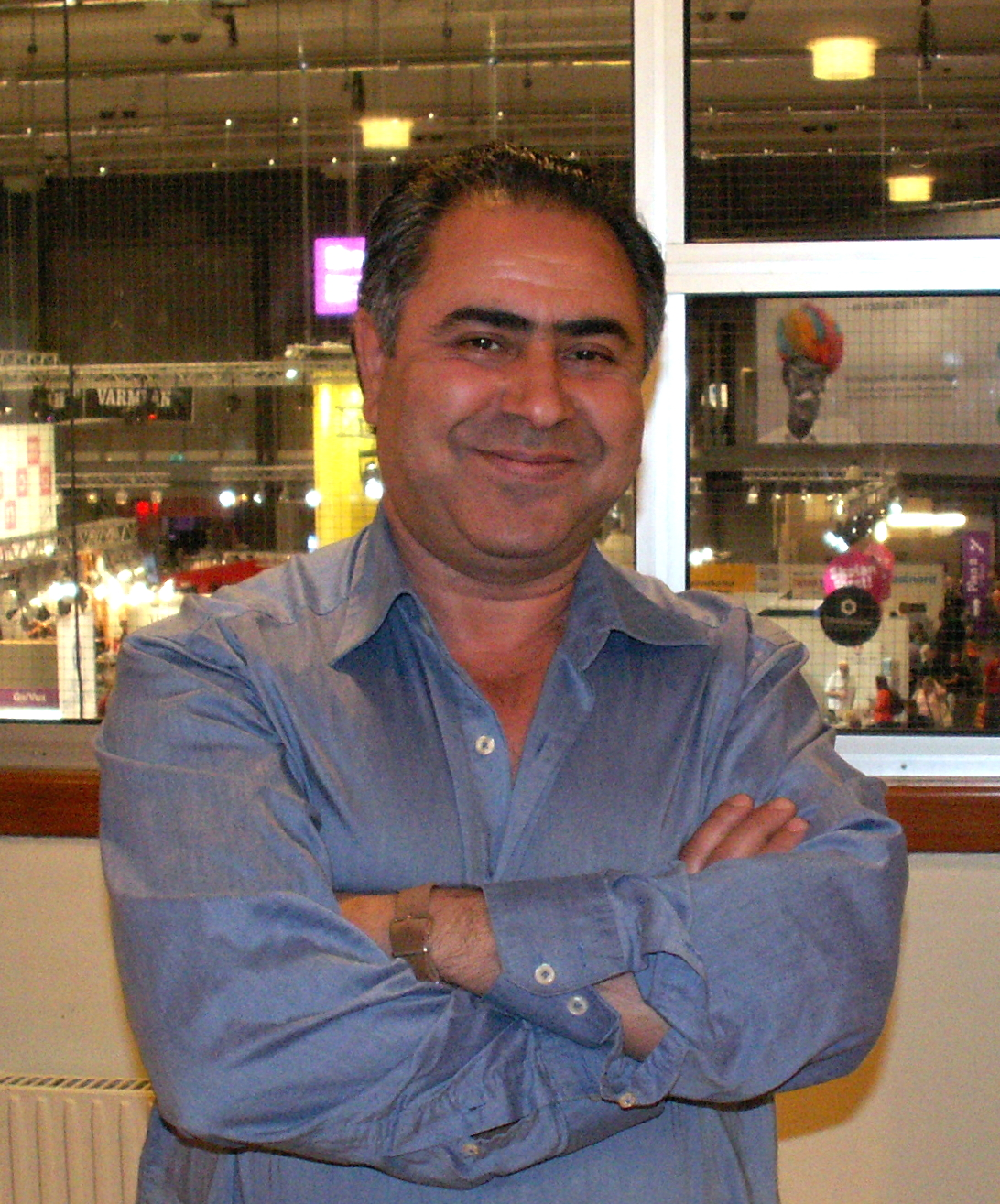
- Born: Salem Zinya; September 26, 1962; Freha, Algeria
- Citizenship: Algerian
- Education: University of Liège
- Occupations: Writer, journalist, poet
- Spouse: Kaissa Ould Braham
- Awards: Premi Veu Lliure (2021)

Salem Zenia (Kabyle: Salem Zinya, born September 26, 1962 in Freha, Tizi Ouzou Province, Algeria) is a Kabyle writer.

He studied in Frèha and later in Azazga High School and journalism (distance studies) in Ecole Universalis (Liège, Belgique) .

He has worked as a journalist for several publications and participated in several Kabyle movements. He created Racines/Iz’uran journal in 1998 and was awarded with the honour diploma of Tamazgha association in Paris.

He lives in Barcelona as a refugee.

== Premio Ostana "Special Prize" ==
In June 2017, Zenia was awarded the "Special Prize" of the Premio Ostana, to be awarded by the Municipality of Ostana, Cuneo, Italy. It is an annual prize and cultural initiative organized by the Municipality of Ostana and by the Cultural Association Chambra d'Oc, dedicated to languages and to literary authors who use a "mother tongue", a present-day minority language of territorial belonging, in their works.

== Books ==
- 1993, Les rêves de Yidir = Tirga n Yidir (Yidir's Dreams)
- 1995, Tafrara (The Dawn)
- 2003, Lyil d wefru
- 2004, Tifeswin (Springtime)
