= Barge, Piedmont =

Barge
- Comune
- Comune di Barge
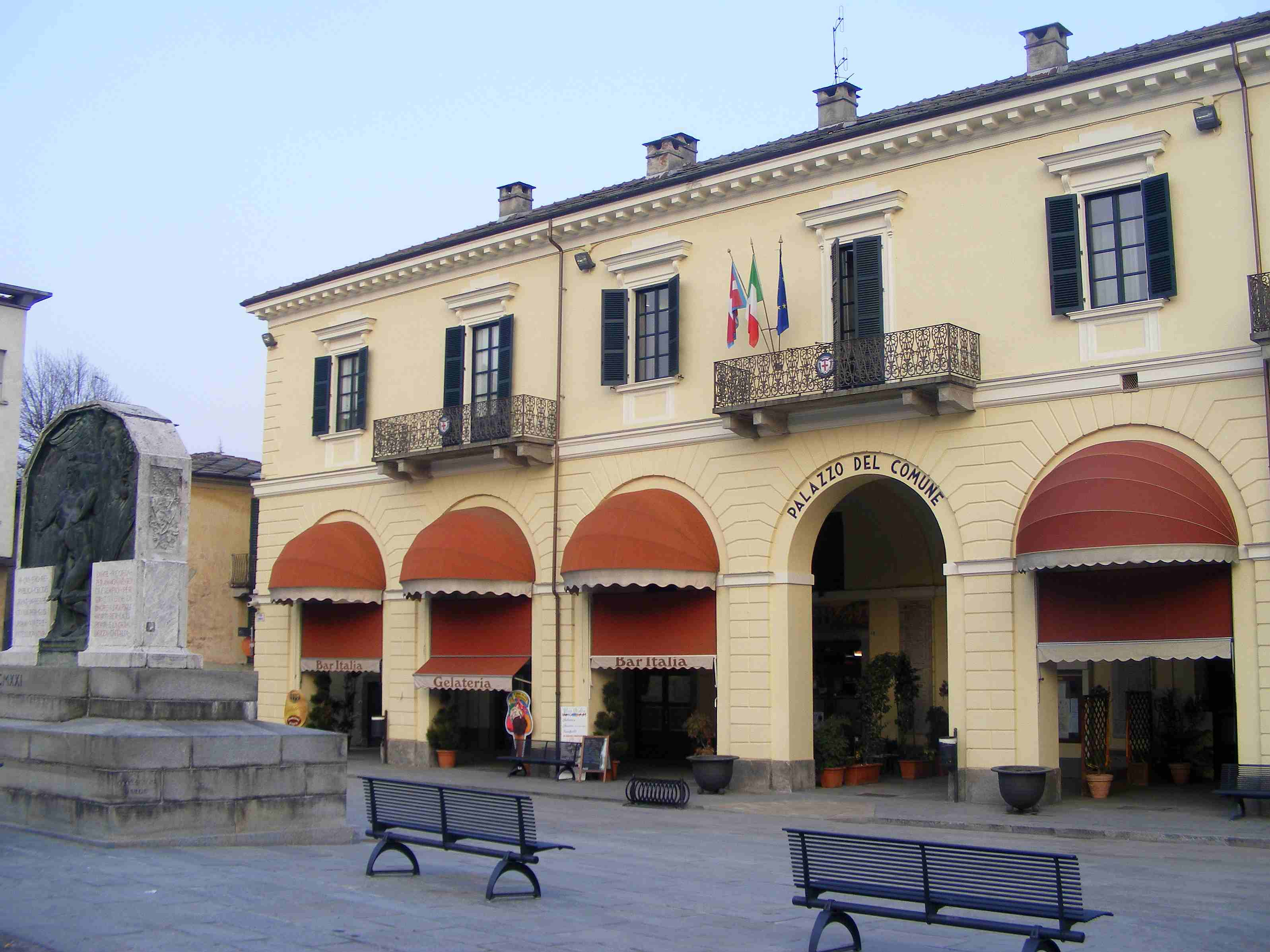
- Palazzo comunale

- Coat of arms

- Location within Italy Location within Piedmont
- Coordinates: 44°44′N 7°19′E
- Country: Italy
- Region: Piedmont
- Province: Cuneo (CN)

Government
  - Mayor: Piera Comba

Area
  - Total: 82.3 km^{2} (31.8 sq mi)
- Elevation: 316 m (1,037 ft)

Population (30 April 2017)
  - Total: 7,694
  - Density: 93.5/km^{2} (242/sq mi)
- Demonym: Bargesi
- Time zone: UTC+1 (CET)
  - Summer (DST): UTC+2 (CEST)
- Postal code: 12032
- Dialing code: 0175
- Patron saint: St. John the Baptist
- Saint day: 24 June
- Website: Official website

Barge is a comune (municipality) in the Province of Cuneo in the Italian region Piedmont, located about 50 kilometres (31 mi) southwest of Turin and about 45 kilometres (28 mi) northwest of Cuneo. The population numbered 7,589 as of 30 November 2019.

Barge borders the following municipalities: Bagnolo Piemonte, Cardè, Cavour, Envie, Ostana, Paesana, Revello, Sanfront, and Villafranca Piemonte.

== Geography ==
The town is situated at the foot of the Cottian Alps, near Monviso and more precisely, in a basin at the foot of Mount Bracco and Mount Medìa. The inhabited centre is crossed by two streams (Chiappera and Infernotto), which join to form a third one, the Ghiandone, which joins the river Po near Staffarda. Barge lies about 360-390 metres above sea level.

== Name ==
The name Barge is thought to derive from the ancient word 'barga', whose meaning is debated. According to one view, it means "shelter" or "hut". Others maintain it is to be linked to the ancient root *berg-/*barg-/*breg-/*brig- with the meaning of "elevated ground/mountain". In the south of France, localities with names such as Barge/La Barge/Barges/Bargettes lie at the foot of a mountain. The same applies to the Spanish toponym Vargas. The name of the Tuscan town of Barga may derive from the same root.

== History ==
Rock engravings at the top of Mount Bracco and Mount Medìa attest to the area having been populated in prehistoric times, but little is known about their creators.

Barge is situated in an area which, in the pre-Roman age, belonged to the Celtic-Ligurian culture of the Taurini. In Roman times it was a pagus (small village) belonging to the main settlement located by the Rocca di Cavour, a huge isolated mass of granite rising from the nearby town of Cavour. This settlement is mentioned by Pliny as the second most important in the Taurine lands, after Segusia (Susa). At the foot of the rocca (6 km from the current centre of Barge) the proconsul Gaius Vibius Pansa founded a Roman market settlement called Forum Vibii Cabur.

The first document mentioning the name of Barge dates back to 1001, an imperial diploma of Otto III. However, the large First Romanesque bell tower of the church of San Giovanni Battista demonstrates that the village was a centre of some importance already in the first quarter of the 11th century (being the largest parish bell tower in a very large area). Barge was part of Turin's lands.

Between the 11th and 13th centuries, it was under the rule of a lordly consortium, called "Dei Signori di Barge", who swore allegiance at the same time to both the House of Savoy and the Marquises of Saluzzo.

In 1363, Barge was plundered and pillaged, and passed definitively into Savoy hands.

From the middle of the 16th century, the area suffered from frequent wars, with Spanish, French and Piedmontese armies passing through, aiming to control the important castle, and leaving destruction and misery in their wake, culminating with an epidemic of the plague in 1630, which left the region depopulated. In that year Charles Emmanuel I incorporated the town into the province of Saluzzo, detaching it from that of Pinerolo.

At the end of the 18th century, the town was involved in the war between Piedmont and France: in 1690, the French marshal Catinat, after his victory at the Battle of Staffarda, moved against Barge, devastating the territory and plundering the town. A relative period of peace in the eighteenth century helped to heal the wounds of the past decades.

Barge was a centre for the production of firearms from the 14th century until the 18th century, an industry started by the Thorosano family. Another local industry was the quartzite mine of Mombracco, mentioned by Leonardo da Vinci.

In September 1943, the first partisan formation in Northern Italy was founded in Barge.

== Main sights ==
Barge has a small but attractive historic centre with a warren of narrow streets, abutted by the fast-flowing Chiappera and Infernotto streams and overlooked by the ruins of the Castello Inferiore, with the green foothills of the Cottian Alps beyond. The streets are lined with small shops and cafés, and a weekly market takes place in the covered marketplace.

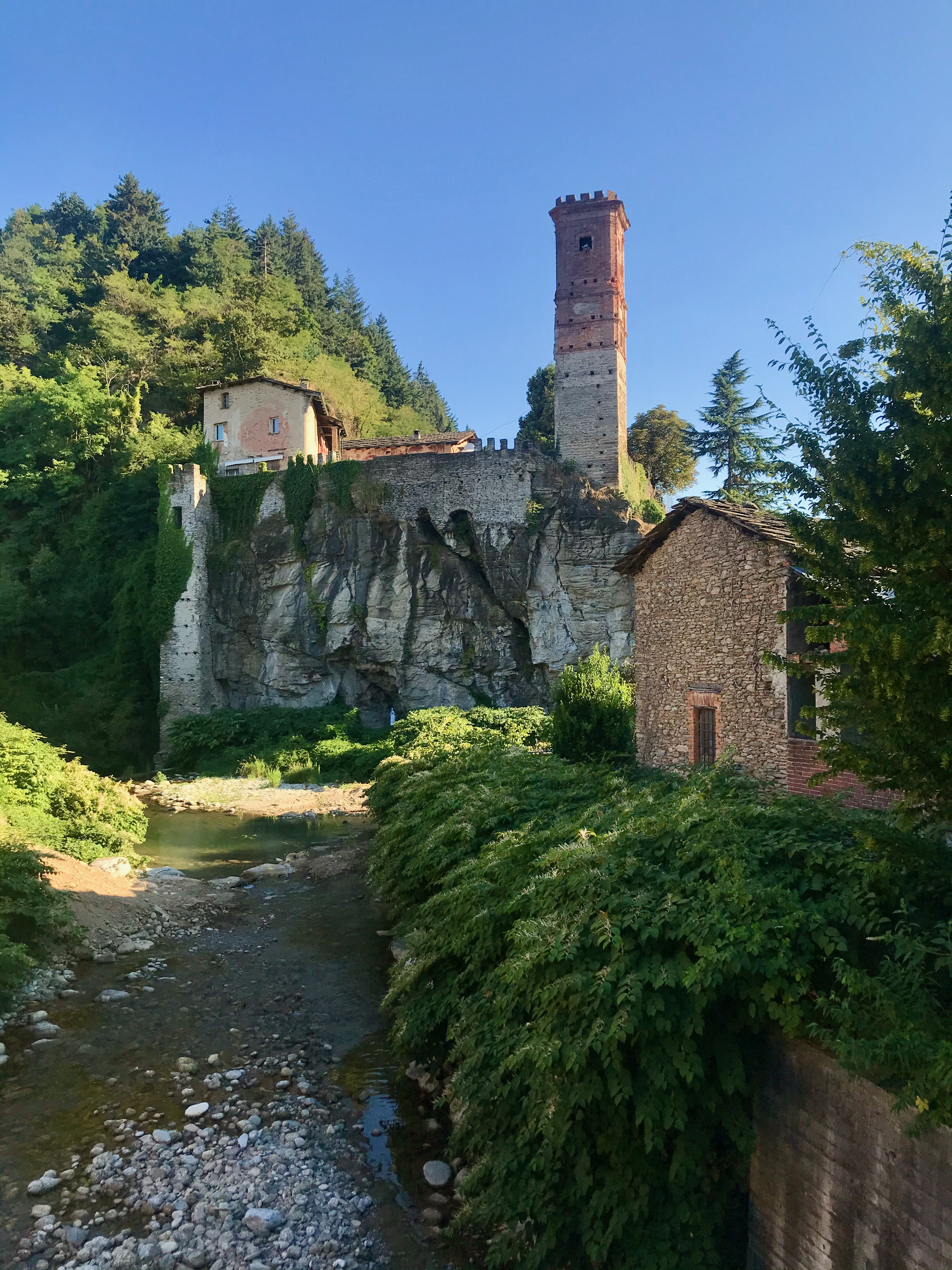
The Castello Inferiore

The principal historic religious buildings include:

- The Parish Church of San Giovanni Battista is one of the largest non-episcopal churches in Piedmont (over 1000 m²). Originally built in a Lombard Romanesque style, it was rebuilt in the Gothic style in 1501 and then in Baroque style between 1730 and 1740, according to a design by Francesco Gallo di Mondovì, royal architect and military engineer, who designed many other churches in the region.
- The Church of Santa Maria Assunta, once dedicated to the Holy Cross and popularly known by the name of Crosà.
- The convent complex of Mombracco, consisting of three churches: the Madonna della Rocca; San Salvatore (ruined) and Santa Maria (now called San Giacomo).
- The Sanctuary of Our Lady of the Combe, dedicated to Our Lady of the Snow; it is located in the hamlet of the same name. A festival is celebrated here in the first days of August and is one of the most famous festivals in Barge.

Examples of historic military architecture are:

- The Castello Inferiore (lower castle), also known as Castelvecchio, rises from a rock in the centre of the village and served as a defensive works in the 12th century, but lost its military importance after the Savoy conquest in 1363, when the Castello Superiore (upper castle) was built. It then became a Franciscan Convent in the 15th century. The stone arch of the enormous drawbridge of the ancient castle remains, while the bell tower of the convent has been preserved. Its upper part was restored in Baroque style in the 18th century and was completed with a crenellated crowning in the second half of the 19th century.
- The Castello Superiore (upper castle), also known as Castelnuovo, was built in the first quarter of the 14th century by the Marquis of Saluzzo. It fell into Savoy hands definitively in 1364. Rebuilt several times, it was destroyed during the wars between France and Spain.

== Twin towns ==
- Annonay, France
- Freyre, Argentina
