= Envie =

- Comune
- Comune di Envie
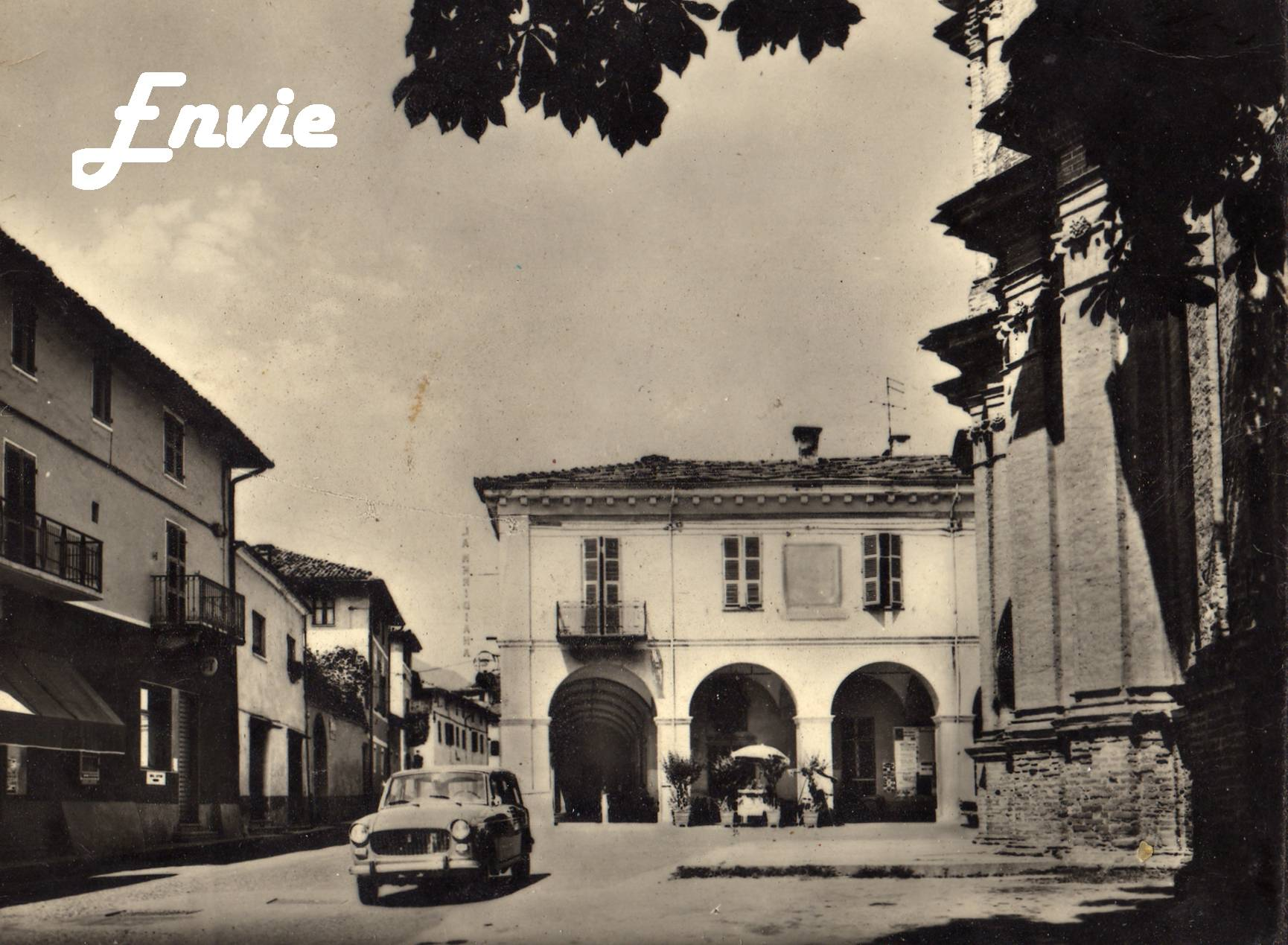

- Location within Italy Location within Piedmont
- Coordinates: 44°41′N 7°22′E
- Country: Italy
- Region: Piedmont
- Province: Cuneo (CN)
- Frazioni: Occa

Government
  - Mayor: Roberto Mellano

Area
  - Total: 25.1 km^{2} (9.7 sq mi)
- Elevation: 327 m (1,073 ft)

Population (31 July 2017)
  - Total: 2,025
  - Density: 80.7/km^{2} (209/sq mi)
- Demonym: Enviesi
- Time zone: UTC+1 (CET)
  - Summer (DST): UTC+2 (CEST)
- Postal code: 12030
- Dialing code: 0175
- Website: Official website

Envie is a comune (municipality) in the province of Cuneo, Piedmont, northern Italy, located about 50 kilometres (31 mi) southwest of Turin and about 35 kilometres (22 mi) northwest of Cuneo.

Envie borders the following municipalities: Barge, Revello, Rifreddo, Sanfront.

== Twin towns ==
- María Susana, Argentina
