= Ostana =

- Comune
- Comune di Ostana
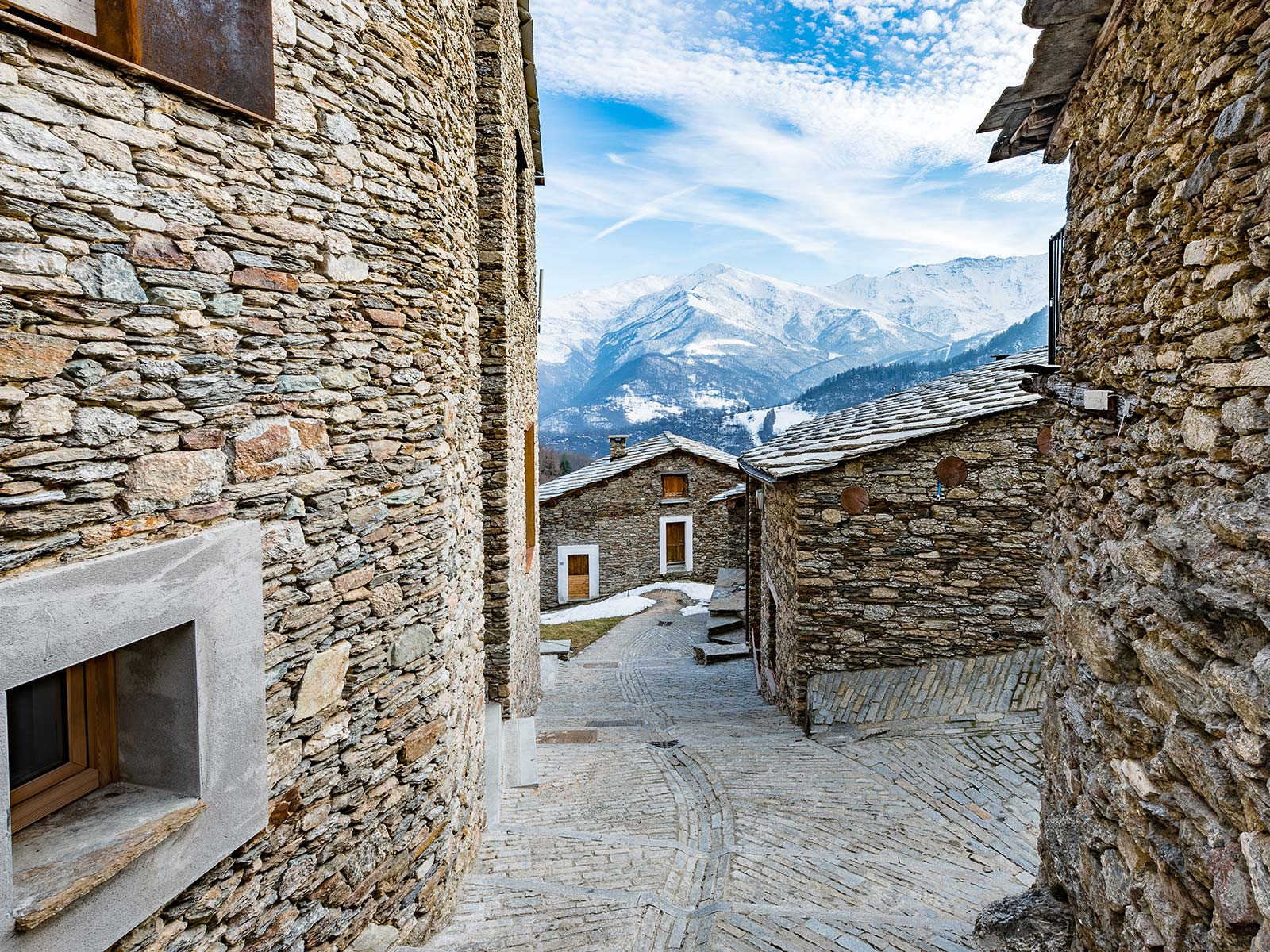

- Location within Italy Location within Piedmont
- Coordinates: 44°42′N 7°11′E
- Country: Italy
- Region: Piedmont
- Province: Cuneo (CN)

Government
  - Mayor: Silvia Rovere

Area
  - Total: 16.8 km^{2} (6.5 sq mi)
- Elevation: 1,250 m (4,100 ft)

Population (31 December 2023)
  - Total: 87
  - Density: 5.2/km^{2} (13/sq mi)
- Demonym: Ostanesi
- Time zone: UTC+1 (CET)
  - Summer (DST): UTC+2 (CEST)
- Postal code: 12030
- Dialing code: 0175

Ostana is a comune (municipality) in the Province of Cuneo in the Italian region Piedmont, located about 60 kilometres (37 mi) southwest of Turin and about 45 kilometres (28 mi) northwest of Cuneo. Its population has been in decline and in January 2016 it recorded its first birth since the 1980s.

Ostana borders the following municipalities: Bagnolo Piemonte, Barge, Crissolo, Oncino, and Paesana. It is one of I Borghi più belli d'Italia ("The most beautiful villages of Italy").

== The Ostana Prize ==
Every year at the beginning of the June, the city hosts the Ostana Prize - Writings in the Mother Tongue [in Italian: Ostana Premio Scritture in Lingua Madre]. It is an annual prize and cultural initiative organized by the Municipality of Ostana and by the Cultural Association Chambra d'Oc. It is dedicated to languages and to literary authors who use a "mother tongue", a present-day minority language of territorial belonging, in their works. The event began in 2008 and is held in Ostana, a municipality in the Valle Po (Italy), every year at the beginning of June. It is open to the public with free admission.

== Notable events ==
In January 2016, the town welcomed its first baby in 28 years.
