= Cardè =

- Comune
- Comune di Cardè
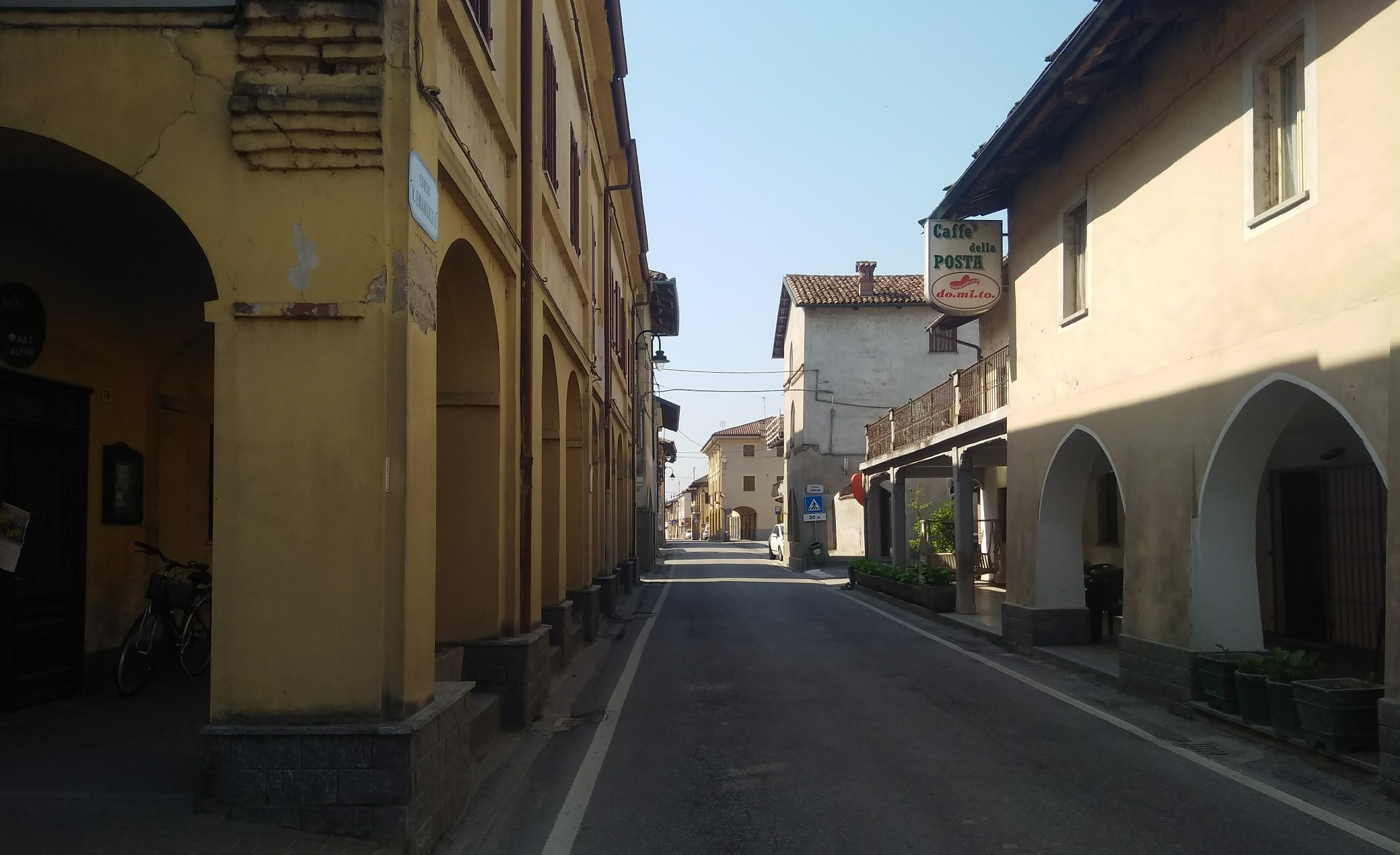

- Coat of arms

- Location within Italy Location within Piedmont
- Coordinates: 44°44′N 7°28′E
- Country: Italy
- Region: Piedmont
- Province: Province of Cuneo (CN)
- Frazioni: Ormea, Mileni, Boschi, Tetti

Government
  - Mayor: Matteo Morena

Area
  - Total: 19.33 km^{2} (7.46 sq mi)
- Elevation: 258 m (846 ft)

Population (Dec. 2004)
  - Total: 1,077
  - Density: 55.72/km^{2} (144.3/sq mi)
- Demonym: Cardettesi
- Time zone: UTC+1 (CET)
  - Summer (DST): UTC+2 (CEST)
- Postal code: 12030
- Dialing code: 0172
- Patron saint: Madonna della Salesea
- Saint day: Second Sunday of September
- Website: Official website

Cardè is a comune (municipality) in the Province of Cuneo in the Italian region Piedmont, located about 40 kilometres (25 mi) southwest of Turin and about 40 kilometres (25 mi) north of Cuneo. As of 31 December 2004, it had a population of 1,077 and an area of 19.3 square kilometres (7.5 mi^{2}).

Cardè borders the following municipalities: Barge, Moretta, Revello, Saluzzo, and Villafranca Piemonte.

== Demographic evolution ==
Historical population

Year	Pop.	±%
1861	2,114	—
1871	2,145	+1.5%
1881	2,187	+2.0%
1901	1,897	−13.3%
1911	1,966	+3.6%

Year	Pop.	±%
1921	1,879	−4.4%
1931	1,979	+5.3%
1936	1,784	−9.9%
1951	1,576	−11.7%
1961	1,312	−16.8%

Year	Pop.	±%
1971	1,243	−5.3%
1981	1,127	−9.3%
1991	1,068	−5.2%
2001	1,069	+0.1%

Source: Data from ISTAT
