= Oncino =

- Comune
- Comune di Oncino
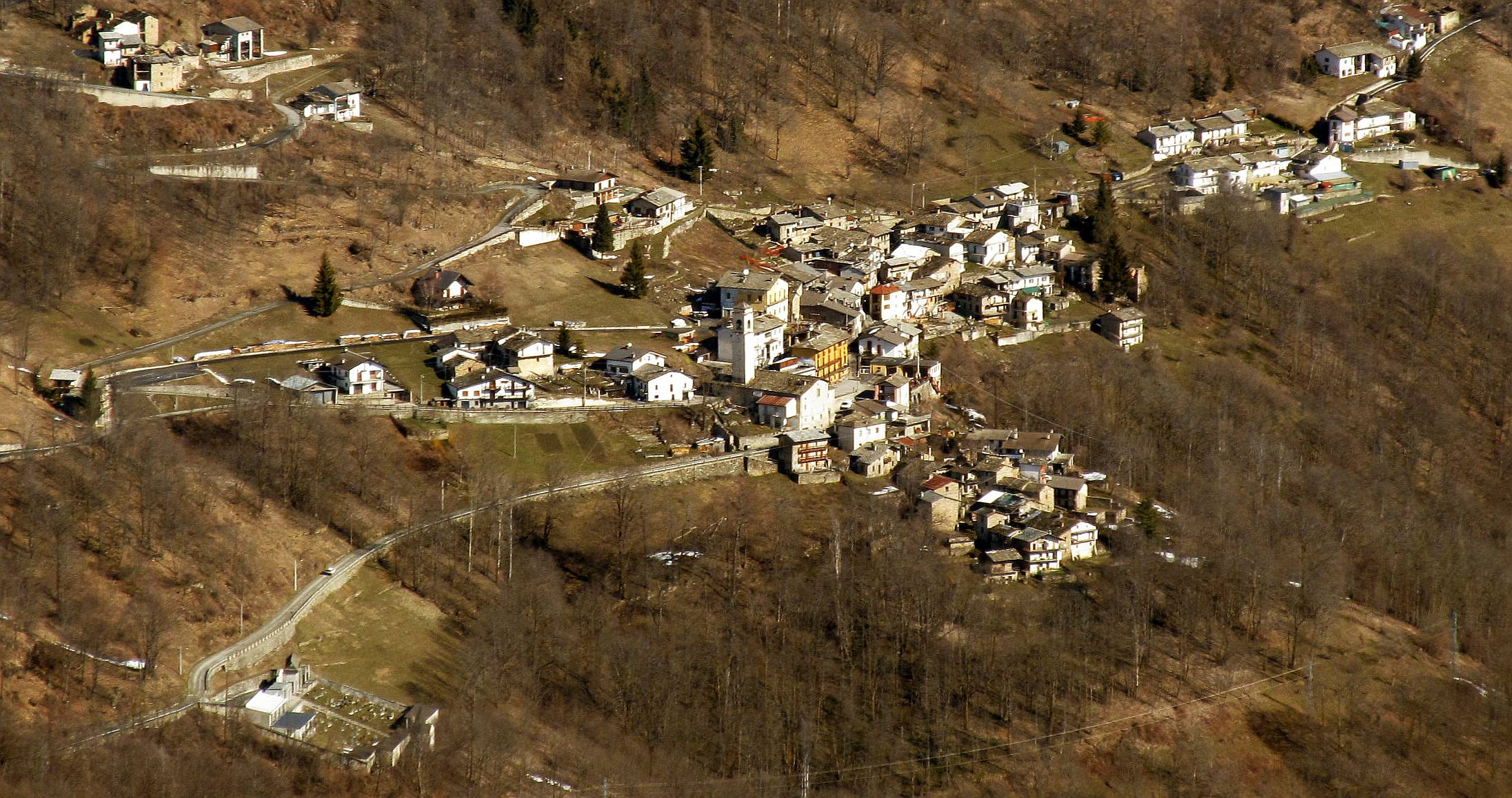

- Location within Italy Location within Piedmont
- Coordinates: 44°41′N 7°11′E
- Country: Italy
- Region: Piedmont
- Province: Province of Cuneo (CN)
- Frazioni: Villa, Ruata, Ruera, Serre, Saret, Sant'Ilario, Arlongo, Piatette, Paschie', Tirolo, Bigorie, Chiotti, Porcili

Area
  - Total: 48.6 km^{2} (18.8 sq mi)

Population (Dec. 2004)
  - Total: 93
  - Density: 1.9/km^{2} (5.0/sq mi)
- Demonym: Oncinesi
- Time zone: UTC+1 (CET)
  - Summer (DST): UTC+2 (CEST)
- Postal code: 12030
- Dialing code: 0175

Oncino is a comune (municipality) in the Province of Cuneo in the Italian region Piedmont, located about 60 kilometres (37 mi) southwest of Turin and about 45 kilometres (28 mi) northwest of Cuneo. As of 31 December 2004, it had a population of 93 and an area of 48.6 square kilometres (18.8 mi^{2}).

The municipality of Oncino contains the frazioni (subdivisions, mainly villages and hamlets) Villa, Ruata, Ruera, Serre, Saret, Sant'Ilario, Arlongo, Paschie', Tirolo, Bigorie, Chiotti, and Porcili.

Oncino borders the following municipalities: Casteldelfino, Crissolo, Ostana, Paesana, Pontechianale, and Sampeyre.

== Demographic evolution ==
Historical population

Year	Pop.	±%
1861	1,481	—
1871	1,630	+10.1%
1881	1,643	+0.8%
1901	1,699	+3.4%
1911	1,634	−3.8%

Year	Pop.	±%
1921	1,527	−6.5%
1931	1,205	−21.1%
1936	917	−23.9%
1951	565	−38.4%
1961	376	−33.5%

Year	Pop.	±%
1971	282	−25.0%
1981	192	−31.9%
1991	129	−32.8%
2001	102	−20.9%

Source: Data from ISTAT
