= Rifreddo =

- Comune
- Comune di Rifreddo
- Location within Italy Location within Piedmont
- Coordinates: 44°39′N 7°21′E
- Country: Italy
- Region: Piedmont
- Province: Cuneo (CN)

Government
  - Mayor: Cesare Cavallo

Area
  - Total: 6.8 km^{2} (2.6 sq mi)
- Elevation: 433 m (1,421 ft)

Population (31 December 2010)
  - Total: 1,077
  - Density: 160/km^{2} (410/sq mi)
- Demonym: Rifreddesi
- Time zone: UTC+1 (CET)
  - Summer (DST): UTC+2 (CEST)
- Postal code: 12030
- Dialing code: 0175
- Website: Official website

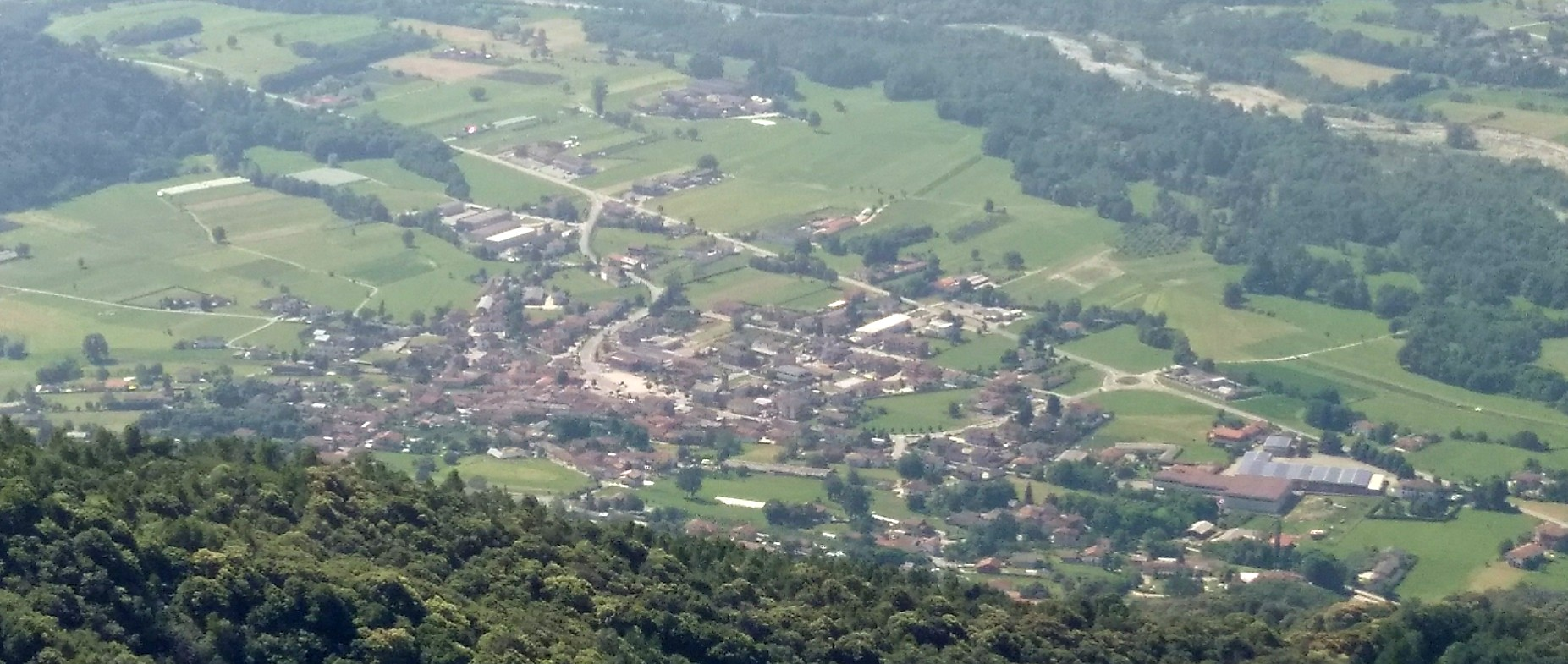
A far view of Rifreddo from a nearby mountain.

Rifreddo is a comune (municipality) in the Province of Cuneo in the Italian region Piedmont, located about 50 kilometres (31 mi) southwest of Turin and about 35 kilometres (22 mi) northwest of Cuneo.

Rifreddo borders the following municipalities: Envie, Gambasca, Revello, and Sanfront.
