= Sanfront =

- Comune
- Comune di Sanfront
- Location within Italy Location within Piedmont
- Coordinates: 44°39′N 7°19′E
- Country: Italy
- Region: Piedmont
- Province: Cuneo (CN)

Government
  - Mayor: Emidio Meirone

Area
  - Total: 39.7 km^{2} (15.3 sq mi)
- Elevation: 490 m (1,610 ft)

Population (31 December 2010)
  - Total: 2,598
  - Density: 65.4/km^{2} (169/sq mi)
- Demonym: Sanfrontesi
- Time zone: UTC+1 (CET)
  - Summer (DST): UTC+2 (CEST)
- Postal code: 12030
- Dialing code: 0175
- Website: Official website

Sanfront is a comune (municipality) in the Province of Cuneo in the Italian region Piedmont, located about 60 kilometres (37 mi) southwest of Turin and about 35 kilometres (22 mi) northwest of Cuneo.

Sanfront borders the following municipalities: Barge, Brossasco, Envie, Gambasca, Paesana, Rifreddo, and Sampeyre.
