= Paesana =

- Comune
- Comune di Paesana
- Coat of arms

- Location within Italy Location within Piedmont
- Coordinates: 44°41′N 7°17′E
- Country: Italy
- Region: Piedmont
- Province: Province of Cuneo (CN)

Government
  - Mayor: Mario Anselmo; Elected: 2004-06-13

Area
  - Total: 58.1 km^{2} (22.4 sq mi)
- Elevation: 650 m (2,130 ft)

Population (Dec. 2004)
  - Total: 3,027
  - Density: 52.1/km^{2} (135/sq mi)
- Demonym: Paesanesi
- Time zone: UTC+1 (CET)
  - Summer (DST): UTC+2 (CEST)
- Postal code: 12034
- Dialing code: 0175
- Patron saint: San Giuseppe and San Bernardo

Paesana is a comune (municipality) in the Province of Cuneo in the Italian region Piedmont, located about 50 kilometres (31 mi) southwest of Turin and about 40 kilometres (25 mi) northwest of Cuneo. As of 31 December 2004, it had a population of 3,027 and an area of 58.1 square kilometres (22.4 mi^{2}).

Paesana borders the following municipalities: Barge, Oncino, Ostana, Sampeyre, and Sanfront.

== Demographic evolution ==
Historical population

| Year | Pop. | ±% |
|---|---|---|
| 1861 | 7,056 | — |
| 1871 | 7,885 | +11.7% |
| 1881 | 7,995 | +1.4% |
| 1901 | 8,128 | +1.7% |
| 1911 | 8,152 | +0.3% |

| Year | Pop. | ±% |
|---|---|---|
| 1921 | 8,405 | +3.1% |
| 1931 | 6,140 | −26.9% |
| 1936 | 5,026 | −18.1% |
| 1951 | 4,814 | −4.2% |
| 1961 | 4,120 | −14.4% |

| Year | Pop. | ±% |
|---|---|---|
| 1971 | 3,629 | −11.9% |
| 1981 | 3,291 | −9.3% |
| 1991 | 3,182 | −3.3% |
| 2001 | 3,072 | −3.5% |

Source: Data from ISTAT
