= Col du Télégraphe =

Mountain pass in the French Alps

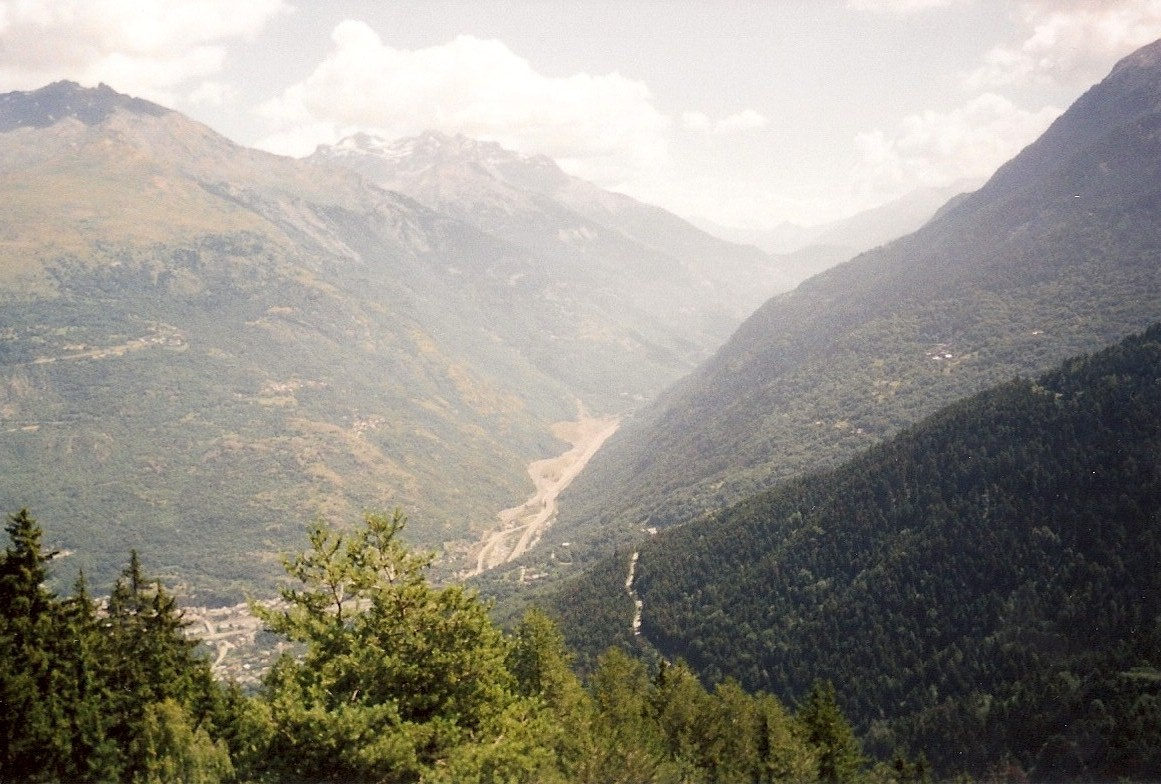

- Location within Alps
- Elevation: 1,566 m (5,138 ft)

Third Approach
- Location: Auvergne-Rhône-Alpes, France
- Range: Graian Alps
- Coordinates: 45°12′9″N 6°26′40″E

Col du Télégraphe is a mountain pass in the French Alps situated above the Maurienne valley between the eastern end of the massif d'Arvan-Villards and the massif des Cerces.

The pass links Saint-Michel-de-Maurienne to the north and Valloire to the south, as well as forming an access point to the col du Galibier via its north face.

The route is often used during the ascent to Col du Galibier in the Tour de France and is thus popular with cyclists.

== Details of the climb ==
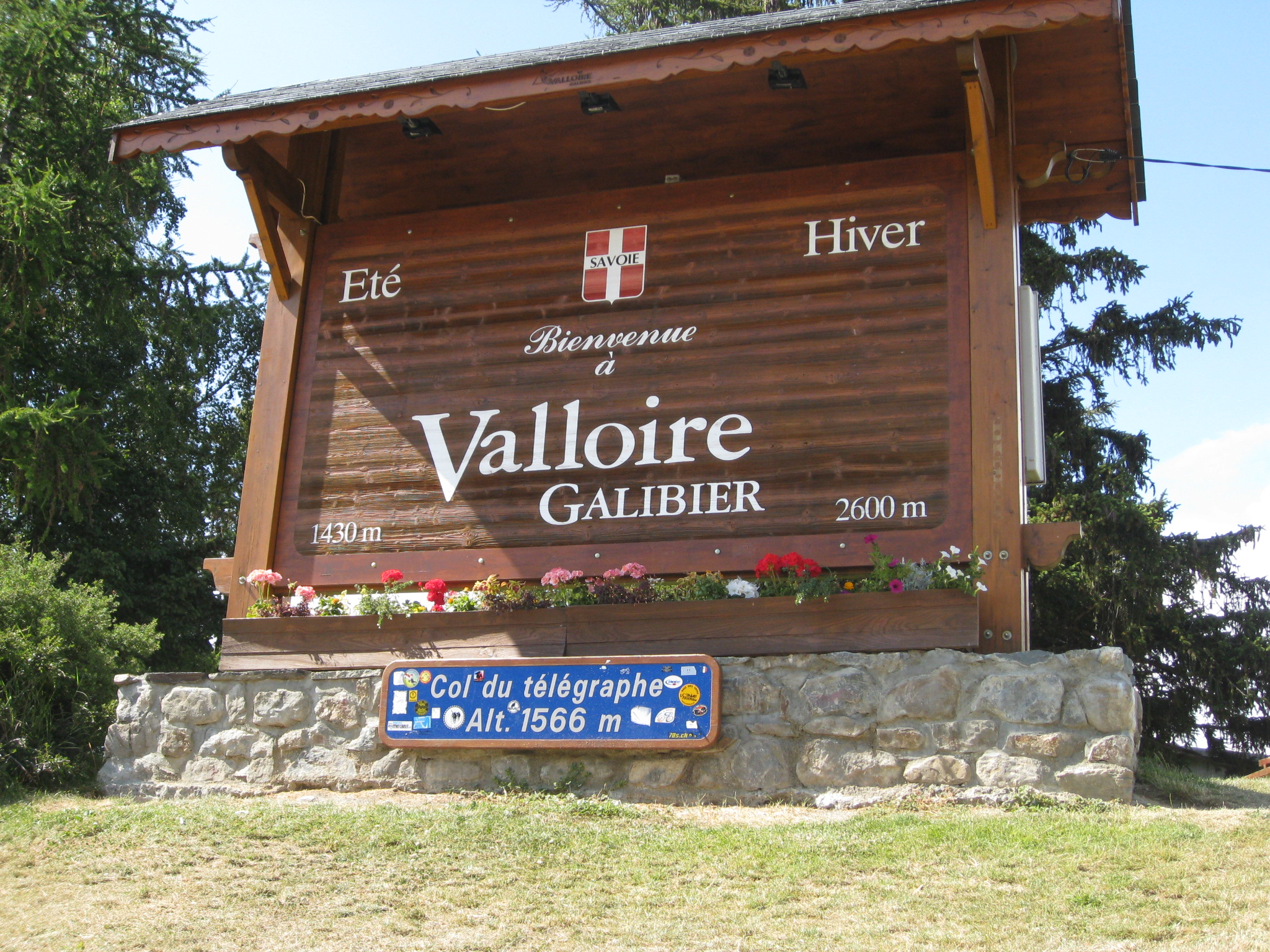
Sign at the top of the Col du Télégraphe

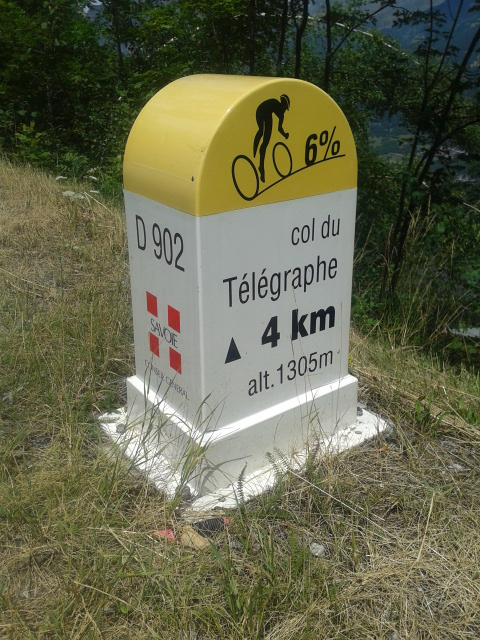
One of the mountain pass cycling milestones along the climb from Saint-Michel-de-Maurienne

From the north, starting at Saint-Michel-de-Maurienne, the climb is 11.8 kilometres (7.3 mi) long, gaining 846 metres (2,776 ft) in height (an average of 7.17%). The maximum gradient is 9.8% at the summit. On this side mountain pass cycling milestones are placed every kilometre. They indicate the current height, the distance to the summit, the average slope in the following kilometre, and the number of the street. As of July 2015, some milestones are missing in the middle part of the climb.

From the south, the climb starts at Valloire and is 4.7 kilometres (2.9 mi) long at an average gradient of 3.32% (height gain: 156 metres (512 ft)), with a maximum gradient of 6.0%.

== The Tour de France ==
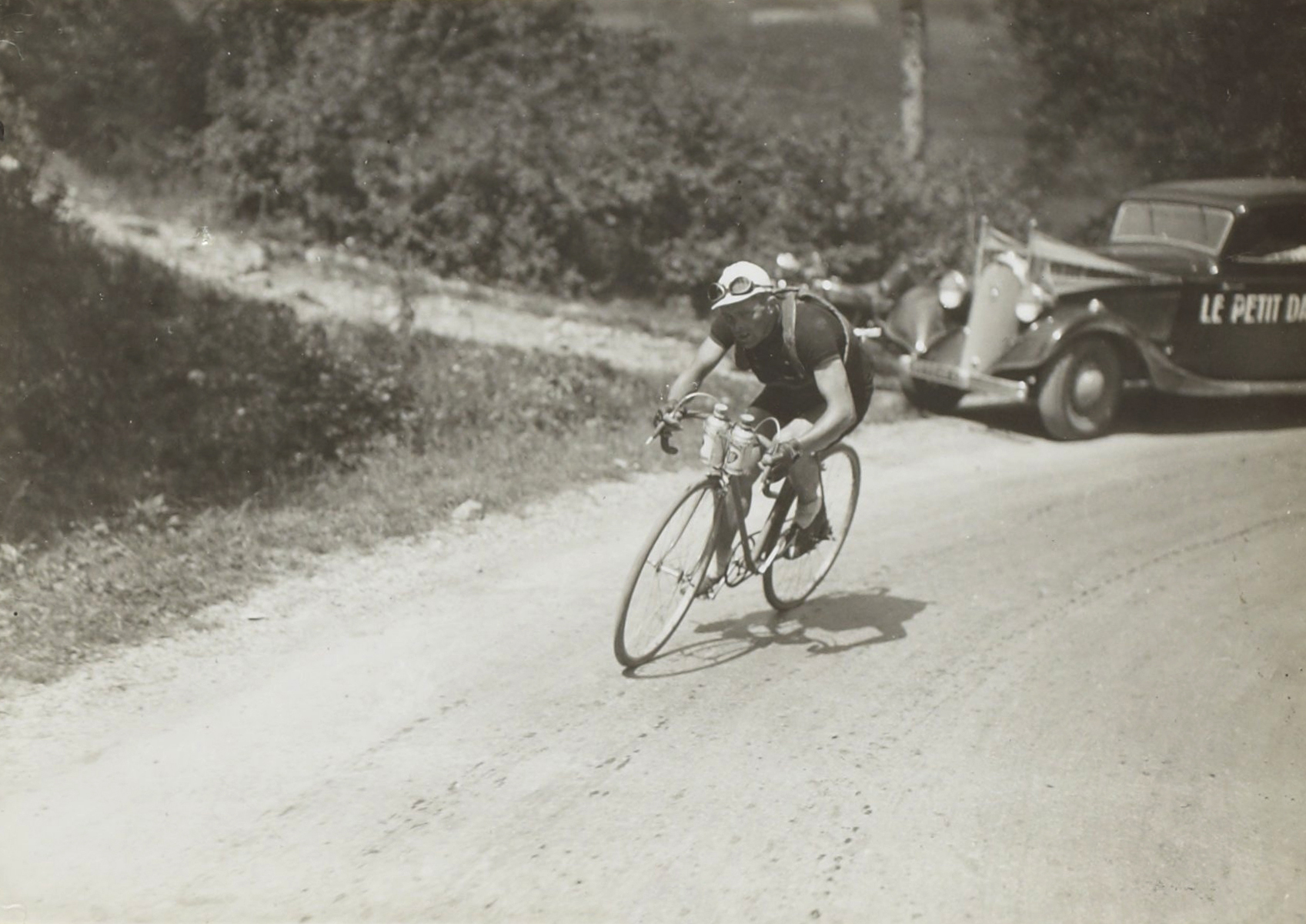
Descent of the Col du Télégraphe during the 1936 Tour de France

The Col du Télégraphe was first used in the Tour de France in 1911; the first rider over the summit was Emile Georget.

Since 1947, the Col du Télégraphe has been crossed 37 times by the Tour de France. On several of those occasions it has not been ranked for points in the King of the Mountains competition, being treated as part of the descent from the Col du Galibier, and has been ranked for points only 19 times.

=== Appearances in the Tour de France (since 1947) ===
Year	Stage	Category	Start	Finish	Leader at the summit
2026	20	1	Le Bourg-d'Oisans	Alpe d'Huez	Richard Carapaz (ECU)
2022	11	1	Albertville	Col du Granon	Pierre Latour (FRA)
2017	17	1	La Mure	Serre-Chevalier	Primož Roglič (SLO)
2011	19	1	Modane	Alpe d'Huez	Gorka Izagirre (ESP)
2007	9	1	Val d'Isère	Briançon	Mikel Astarloza (ESP)
2005	11	1	Courchevel	Briançon	Santiago Botero (COL)
2003	8	2	Sallanches	Alpe d'Huez	Pierrick Fédrigo (FRA)
1999	9	1	Le Grand-Bornand	Sestrières	José-Luis Arrieta (ESP)
1998	15	2	Grenoble	Les Deux-Alpes	Rodolfo Massi (ITA)
1993	10	2	Villard-de-Lans	Serre-Chevalier	Thierry Claveyrolat (FRA)
1989	17	4	Briançon	Alpe d'Huez	Franco Vona (ITA)
1980	17	3	Serre-Chevalier	Morzine	Johan De Muynck (NED)
1979	17	2	Moûtiers	Alpe d'Huez	Giovanni Battaglin (ITA)
1974	11	2	Aix-les-Bains	Serre-Chevalier	Herman Van Springel (BEL)
1972	14b	3	Valloire	Aix-les-Bains	Pietro Campagnari (ITA)
1969	10	2	Chamonix	Briançon	Joaquim Galera (ESP)
1967	10	2	Divonne-les-Bains	Briançon	Julio Jiménez (ESP)
1966	16	2	Le Bourg-d'Oisans	Briançon	Julio Jimenez (ESP)
1964	8	2	Thonon-les-Bains	Briançon	Federico Bahamontes (ESP)
1957	10	2	Thonon-les-Bains	Briançon	Gastone Nencini (ITA)
1955	8	2	Thonon-les-Bains	Briançon	Charly Gaul (LUX)
1947	8	1	Grenoble	Briançon	Fermo Camellini (ITA)

== See also ==
- Fort du Télégraphe, the fortification at the crest of the pass, the location of the semaphore station that gave the pass its name
- Souvenir Henri Desgrange
