= Galibier =

Galibier may refer to:

- Col du Galibier, a mountain pass in France
- Bugatti 16C Galibier, an automobile

== See also ==
- Grand Galibier, a mountain of the Cottian Alps in France
