= Fort du Télégraphe =

19th-century French fort

- Part of Séré de Rivières system
- France
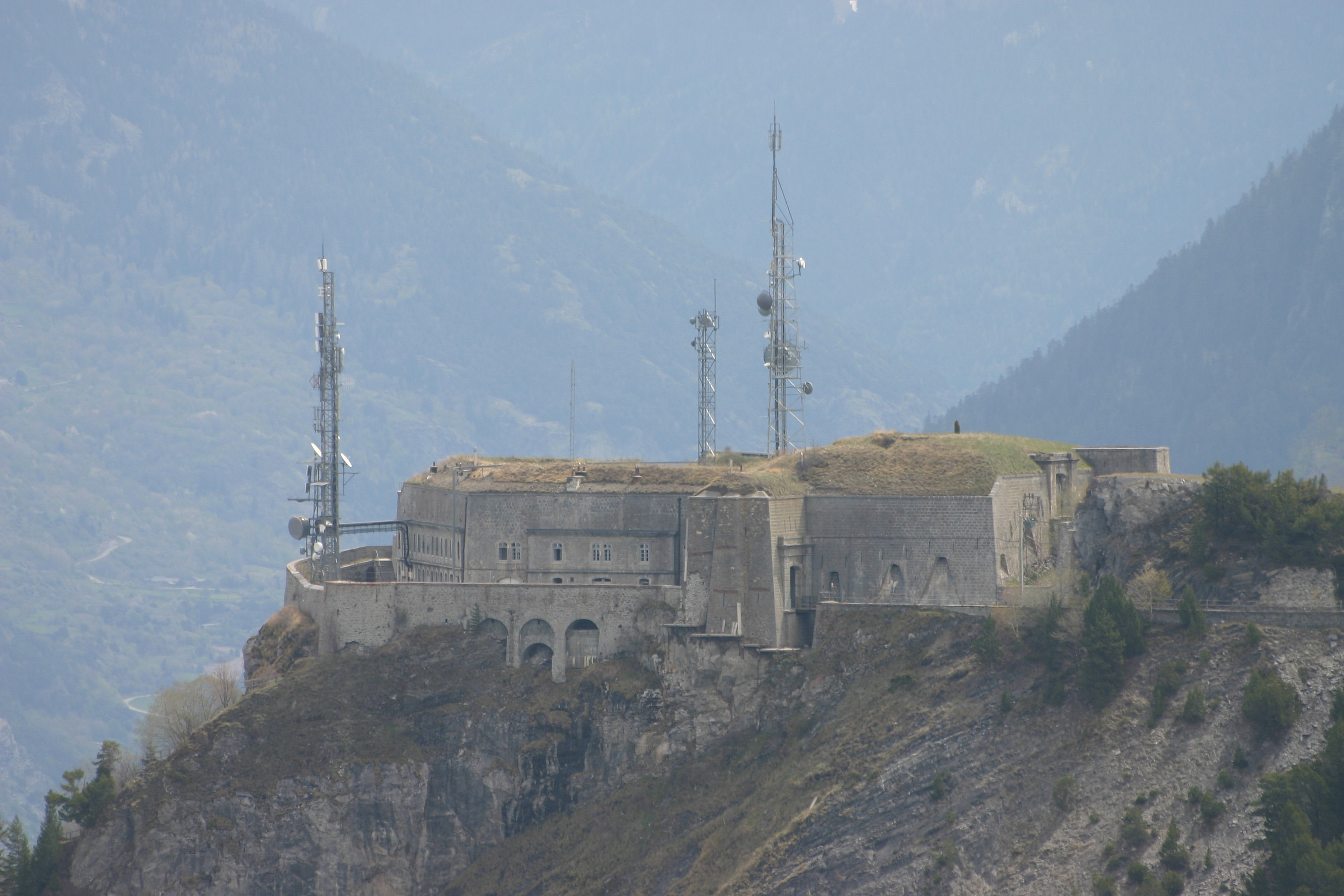

Site information
- Type: Fort
- Controlled by: France
- Open to the public: Yes
- Condition: Preserved

Location
- Location within France
- Coordinates: 45.21061°N 6.44708°E

Site history
- Built: 1884
- Materials: Brick, stone
- Battles/wars: Italian invasion of France, Operation Dragoon

The Fort du Télégraphe, or Fort Berwick, is located in the Maurienne valley on the road to the Col du Galibier between Valloire and Saint-Michel-de-Maurienne, at the Col du Télégraphe, dominating the valley of the Arc. The location at an altitude of 1,585 metres (5,200 ft) previously accommodated a telegraph of the Chappe system using articulating arms to send messages between Lyon and Milan, and after 1809, Venice. The fort has two entrances with drawbridges to allow access to different levels of the fort, with inclined ramps to allow easy movement of artillery pieces. When completed in 1884 after four years of construction, the fort was manned by 170 men, firing four artillery pieces at the main fort and four more at detached batteries.

== History ==
The site was first occupied by Marshal Berwick in the early 18th century. The Fort du Télégraphe was completed between 1886 and 1890 as a part of the Séré de Rivières system of fortifications. It saw no action until 1940, when it fired on Italian forces with 155 mm guns. The fort was part of the "Second Position" (Deuxième Position), a backup to the main fortifications of the modern Alpine Line, the southwestern component of the Maginot Line. The fort was armed with six 155 mm and four 95 mm guns, manned by the 6th battery of the 164th Position Artillery Regiment (164^{e} Régiment d'Artillerie de Position (RAP)).

In 1944 the fort was used by the French Forces of the Interior (FFI) as an artillery position. The fort's peacetime barracks have been retained as high-altitude quarters for the 93rd Mountain Artillery Regiment (Regiment d'Artillerie de Montagne (RAM)) of the 27th Mountain Infantry Brigade.

The Fort du Télégraphe is open for visitation during the summer months. The continuing military use has resulted in its preservation, much as the fort's advantageous position has resulted in its continued use as a communications post, albeit using microwaves in place of semaphores.
