= Grand Aréa =

Mountain in France

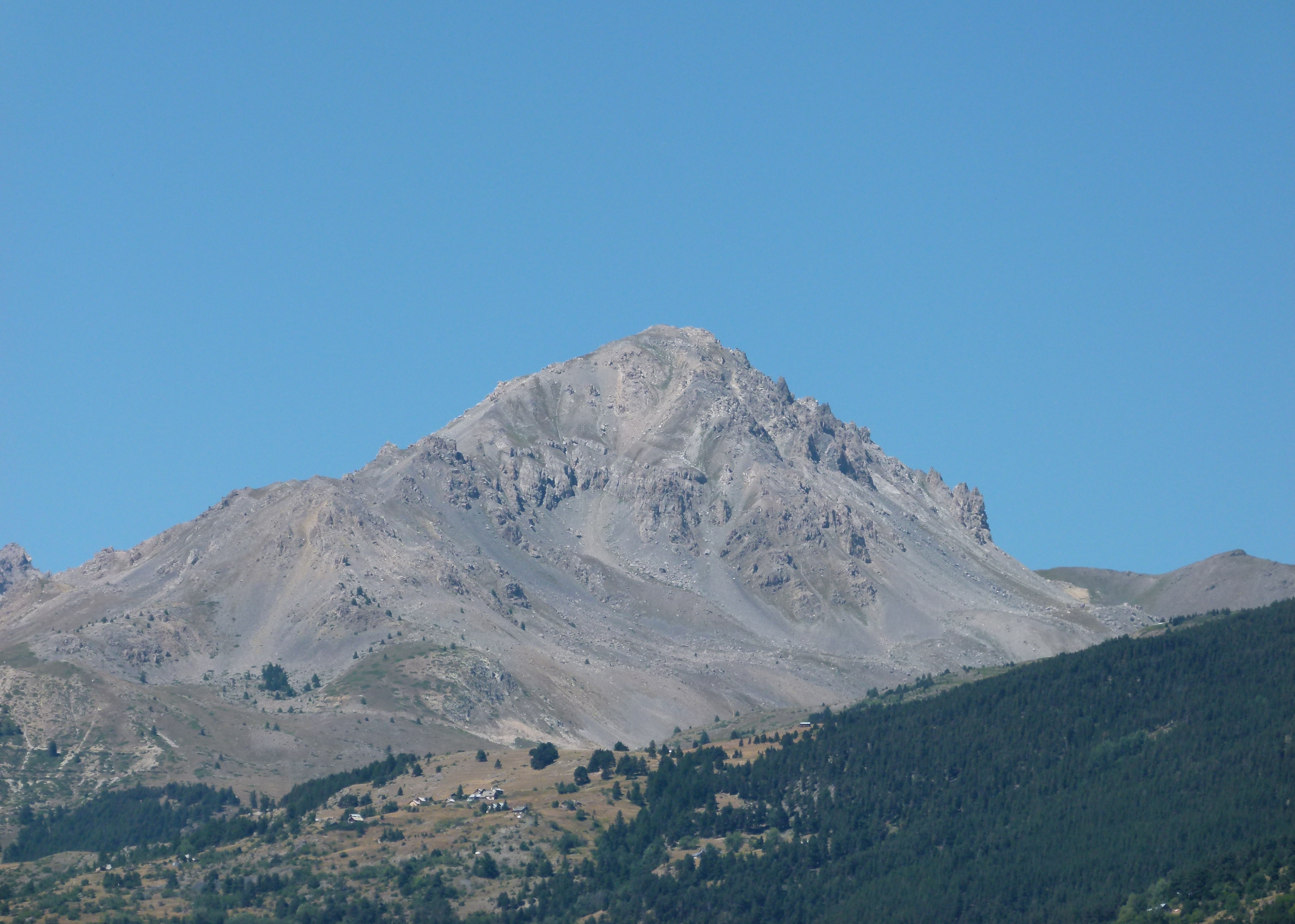
- View from Briançon, showing the south-east face

Highest point
- Elevation: 2,869 m (9,413 ft)
- Prominence: 442 m (1,450 ft)
- Isolation: 10.56 km (6.56 mi)
- Listing: Alpine mountains 2500-2999 m
- Coordinates: 44°58′48″N 6°34′22″E

Geography
- Location within Alps
- Location: Provence-Alpes-Côte d'Azur, France
- Parent range: Cottian Alps

Climbing
- Easiest route: Hike

The Grand Aréa is a 2.869 metres high mountain of the Cottian Alps located in the French department of Hautes-Alpes.

== Features ==
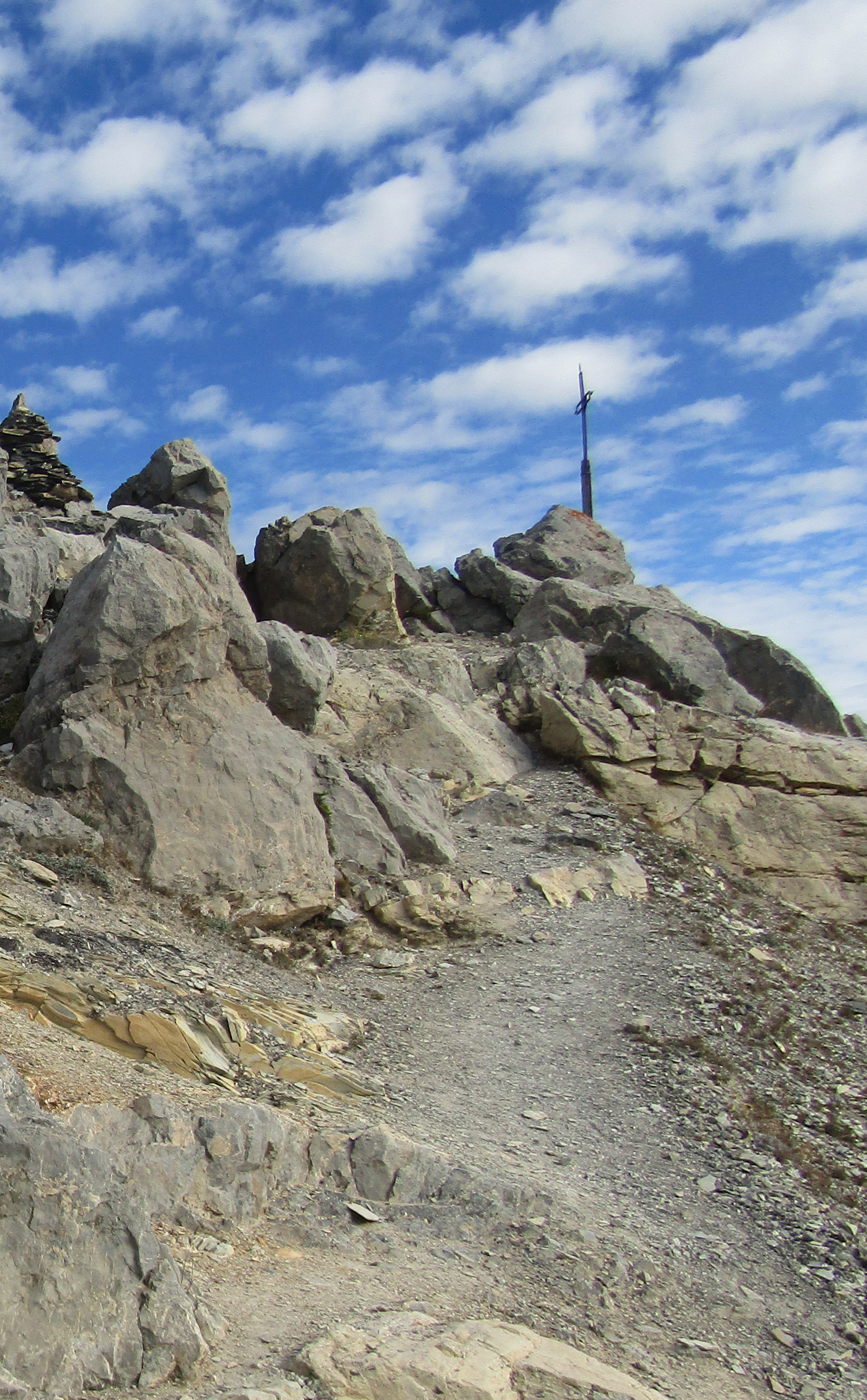
Summit of the mountain

The mountain stands in the Massif des Cerces and on the watershed between the valleys of the Guisane and the Clarée, NW of the Col du Granon. The ridge continues westwards with the Col de Buffère and then towards the Pointe des Cerces.

== Access to the summit ==
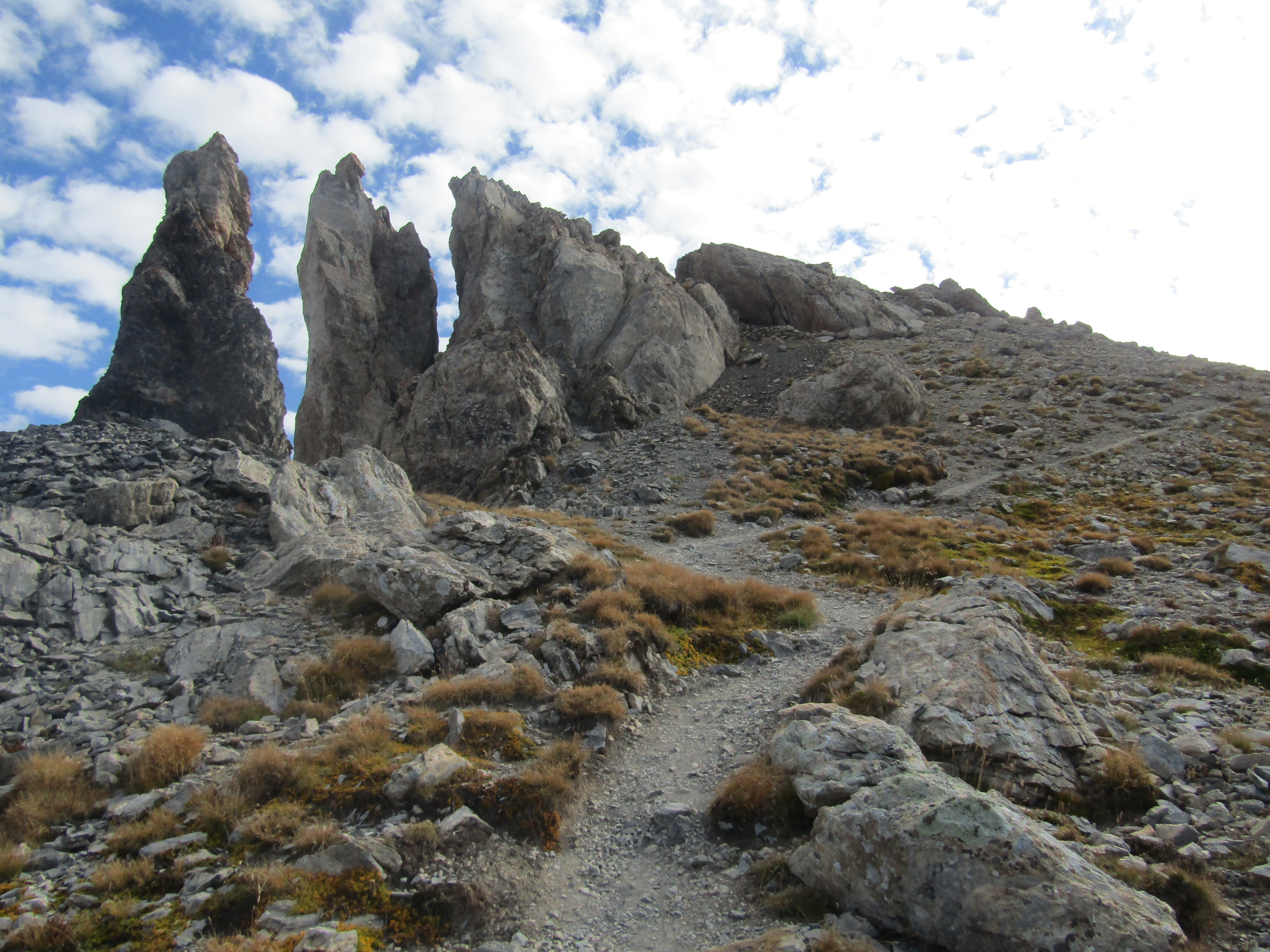
Footpath from Col de Buffère

The summit of the Grand Aréa can be reached by footpaths starting from several neighbouring locations. The hike from the Clarée valley thorough Col de Buffère is considered quite an easy and rewarding walk. The mountain is also a well known destination for ski mountaineering.

== Mountain huts ==
- Refuge de Buffère (2.076 m).

== Maps ==
- French official cartography (Institut géographique national - IGN); on-line version: www.geoportail.fr
