= Villar-d'Arêne =

- Commune
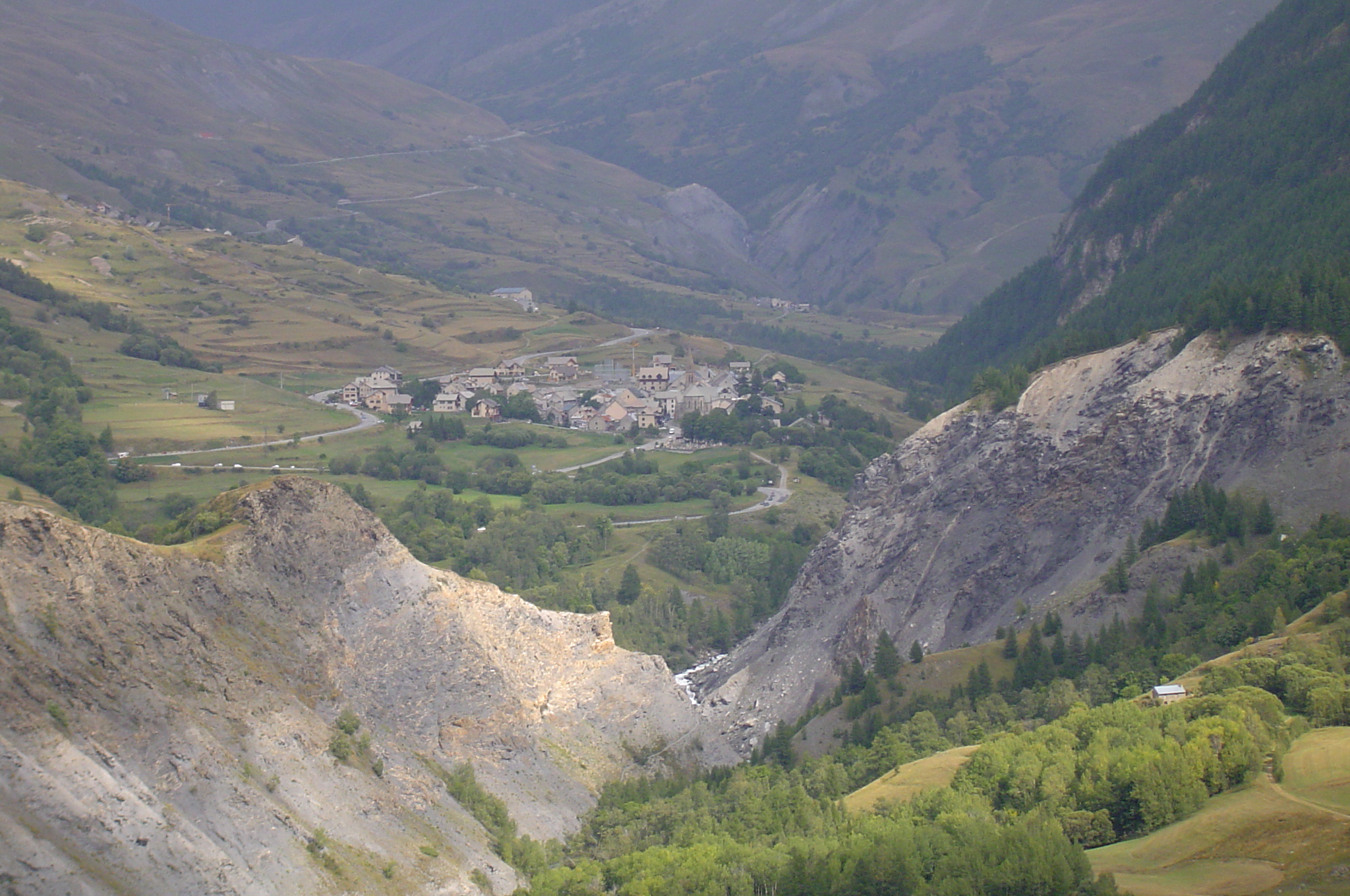
- A general view of the village from the nearby hillside

- Coat of arms
- Location of Villar-d'Arêne
- Location within France Location within Provence-Alpes-Côte d'Azur
- Coordinates: 45°02′37″N 6°20′15″E
- Country: France
- Region: Provence-Alpes-Côte d'Azur
- Department: Hautes-Alpes
- Arrondissement: Briançon
- Canton: Briançon-1
- Intercommunality: Briançonnais

Government
  - Mayor (2026–32): Béatrice Albert
- Area^{1}: 77.51 km^{2} (29.93 sq mi)
- Elevation: 1,650 m (5,410 ft)
- Highest elevation: 3,883 m (12,740 ft)
- Lowest elevation: 1,519 m (4,984 ft)
- Population (2023): 300
  - Density: 3.9/km^{2} (10/sq mi)
- Time zone: UTC+01:00 (CET)
  - Summer (DST): UTC+02:00 (CEST)
- INSEE/Postal code: 05181 /05480
- ^{1} French Land Register data, which excludes lakes, ponds, glaciers > 1 km^{2} (0.386 sq mi or 247 acres) and river estuaries.

Villar-d'Arêne (French pronunciation: [vilaʁ daʁɛn]; Occitan: Vilars d'Arena) is a commune in the Hautes-Alpes department in southeastern France, between Grenoble and Briançon. It is in the French Alps, in Massif des Écrins. Near this village located in the Romanche valley, there is La Grave and Col du Lautaret. The access of the valley and its communes is departmental route 1091 (ex-national route 91) (Grenoble – Le Bourg-d'Oisans – Briançon).

== Climate ==
Climate data for Villar-d'Arêne (1991−2020 normals)
Month	Jan	Feb	Mar	Apr	May	Jun	Jul	Aug	Sep	Oct	Nov	Dec	Year
Record high °C (°F)	12.9 (55.2)	14.9 (58.8)	16.8 (62.2)	21.7 (71.1)	25.6 (78.1)	32.5 (90.5)	31.1 (88.0)	30.1 (86.2)	27.0 (80.6)	21.7 (71.1)	19.1 (66.4)	13.1 (55.6)	32.5 (90.5)
Mean daily maximum °C (°F)	2.4 (36.3)	3.3 (37.9)	6.4 (43.5)	10.8 (51.4)	14.5 (58.1)	19.0 (66.2)	21.5 (70.7)	20.6 (69.1)	17.0 (62.6)	12.7 (54.9)	6.6 (43.9)	3.1 (37.6)	11.5 (52.7)
Daily mean °C (°F)	−3.7 (25.3)	−3.6 (25.5)	0.2 (32.4)	5.1 (41.2)	8.6 (47.5)	12.3 (54.1)	14.1 (57.4)	13.6 (56.5)	10.5 (50.9)	7.0 (44.6)	1.6 (34.9)	−2.4 (27.7)	5.3 (41.5)
Mean daily minimum °C (°F)	−9.8 (14.4)	−10.6 (12.9)	−6 (21)	−0.6 (30.9)	2.7 (36.9)	5.5 (41.9)	6.8 (44.2)	6.5 (43.7)	3.9 (39.0)	1.3 (34.3)	−3.4 (25.9)	−7.8 (18.0)	−1.0 (30.3)
Record low °C (°F)	−26.8 (−16.2)	−29.6 (−21.3)	−25.7 (−14.3)	−18.1 (−0.6)	−8.7 (16.3)	−6.1 (21.0)	−1.2 (29.8)	−2 (28)	−7.3 (18.9)	−11.4 (11.5)	−21.7 (−7.1)	−25.1 (−13.2)	−29.6 (−21.3)
Average precipitation mm (inches)	44.3 (1.74)	44.1 (1.74)	52.6 (2.07)	65.7 (2.59)	95.4 (3.76)	77.0 (3.03)	70.4 (2.77)	81.9 (3.22)	58.1 (2.29)	92.0 (3.62)	102.2 (4.02)	77.5 (3.05)	861.2 (33.9)
Average precipitation days (≥ 1.0 mm)	6.8	6.6	7.3	7.9	11.5	10.6	8.9	9.3	7.4	7.8	8.4	8.5	100.8
Source: Météo-France

== Population ==
Historical population
Year	Pop.	±% p.a.
1968	160	—
1975	155	−0.45%
1982	184	+2.48%
1990	178	−0.41%
1999	219	+2.33%
2007	277	+2.98%
2012	310	+2.28%
2017	311	+0.06%
2023	300	−0.60%
Source: INSEE

== Sights ==
- mountains as Massif des Ecrins, La Meije
- Écrins National Park
- Jardin botanique alpin du Lautaret
- Tradition of boiled bread ("pain bouilli" or "pain noir"), a rye bread made with boiled water, in village's oven

== See also ==
- Communes of the Hautes-Alpes department
