= Ouvrage Col du Granon =

- Part of Maginot Line, Alpine Line
- Southeast France
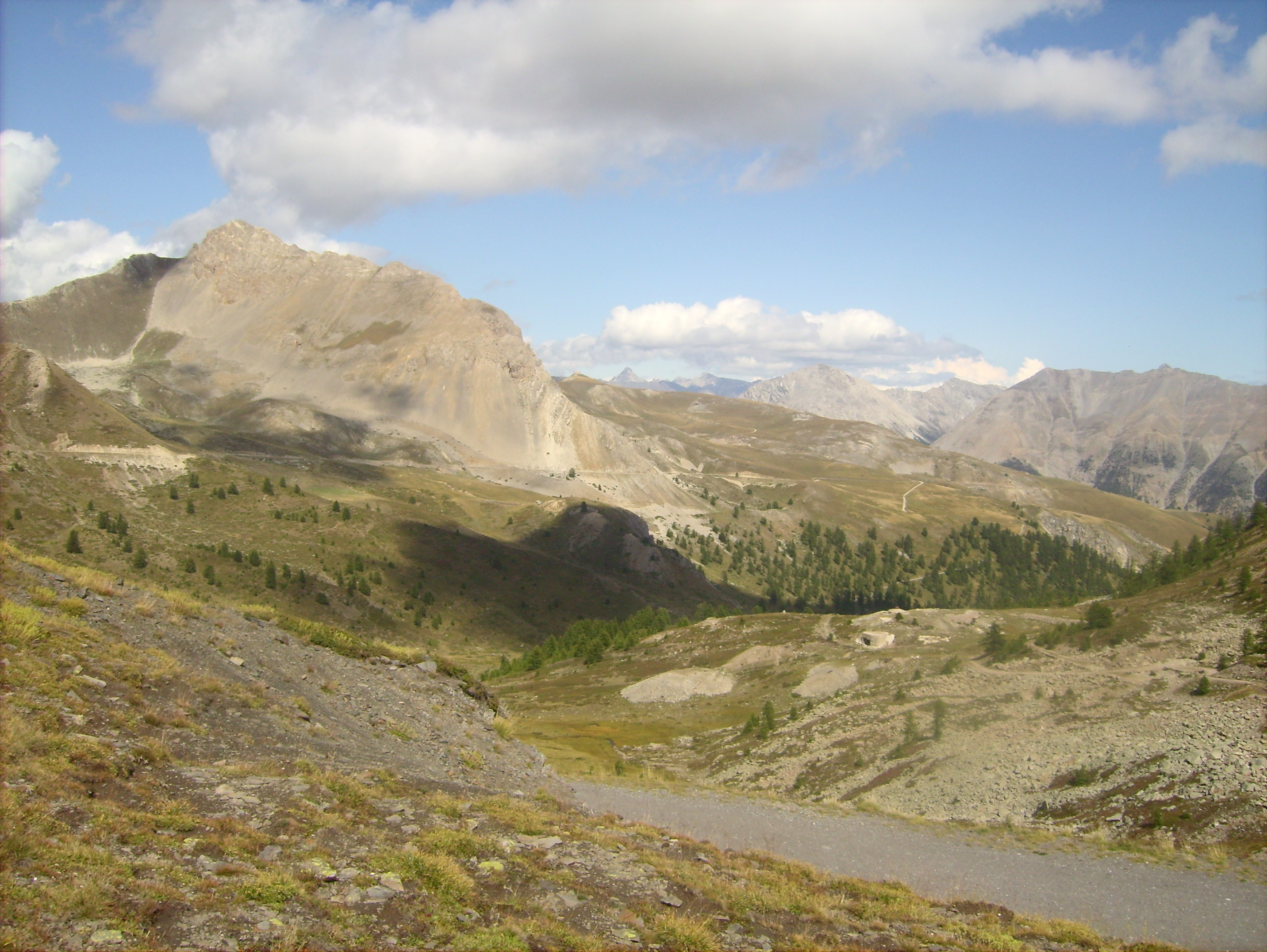
- Combat blocks are visible in the lower right of the image

Site information
- Controlled by: France

Location
- Coordinates: 44.96621°N 6.61573°E

Site history
- Built by: CORF
- In use: Abandoned
- Materials: Concrete, steel, rock excavation
- Battles/wars: Italian invasion of France

Ouvrage Col du Granon is a lesser work (petit ouvrage) of the Maginot Line's Alpine extension, the Alpine Line. The ouvrage consists of one entry block, one infantry block and one observation block covering the Col du Granon as part of the defenses of Briançon and Grenoble. The ouvrage lies at an altitude of 2,329 metres (7,641 ft).

== Description ==
See Fortified Sector of the Dauphiné for a broader discussion of the Dauphiné sector of the Alpine Line.

- Block 1 (entry): two machine gun embrasures.
- Block 2 (unbuilt): one MOM block for a Hotchkiss machine gun.
- Block 3 (infantry): one machine gun cloche, one light and one heavy twin machine gun embrasure.
- Block 4 (infantry): one machine gun/observation cloche.
- Annex: a small flanking position, unique in the Maginot Line, with one twin Reibel machine gun emplacement.

== See also ==
- List of Alpine Line ouvrages

== Bibliography ==
- Allcorn, William. The Maginot Line 1928-45. Oxford: Osprey Publishing, 2003. ISBN 1-84176-646-1
- Kaufmann, J.E. and Kaufmann, H.W. Fortress France: The Maginot Line and French Defenses in World War II, Stackpole Books, 2006. ISBN 0-275-98345-5
- Kaufmann, J.E., Kaufmann, H.W., Jancovič-Potočnik, A. and Lang, P. The Maginot Line: History and Guide, Pen and Sword, 2011. ISBN 978-1-84884-068-3
- Mary, Jean-Yves; Hohnadel, Alain; Sicard, Jacques. Hommes et Ouvrages de la Ligne Maginot, Tome 4 - La fortification alpine. Paris, Histoire & Collections, 2009. ISBN 978-2-915239-46-1 (in French)
- Mary, Jean-Yves; Hohnadel, Alain; Sicard, Jacques. Hommes et Ouvrages de la Ligne Maginot, Tome 5. Paris, Histoire & Collections, 2009. ISBN 978-2-35250-127-5 (in French)
