= Mont Thabor =

Mountain in the French Alps

Highest point
- Elevation: 3,178 m (10,427 ft)
- Prominence: 97 m (318 ft)
- Coordinates: 45°06′51″N 06°33′50″E

Geography
- Location within France
- Location: Savoie and Hautes-Alpes, France
- Parent range: Massif des Cerces

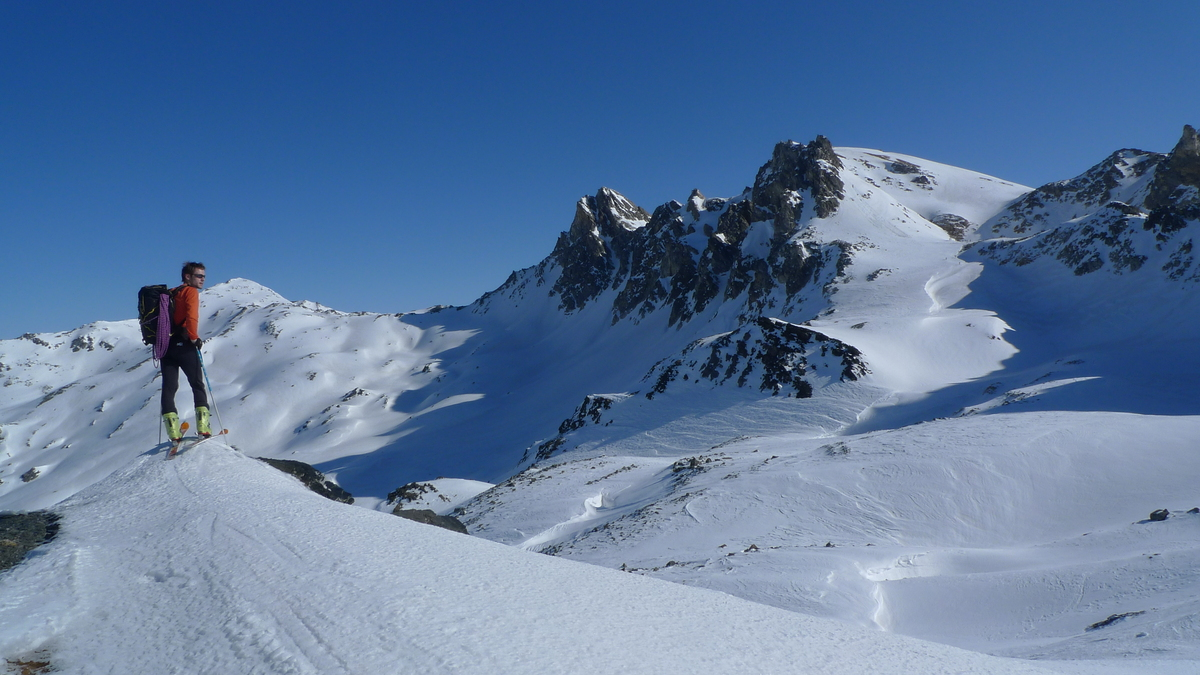
Pic du Thabor on the left, and the Mont Thabor on the right, from the col de Valmenier.

Mont Thabor is a mountain of Savoie and Hautes-Alpes, France. It lies in the Massif des Cerces range. It has an elevation of 3,178 metres above sea level, it stands close to another summit, the Pic du Thabor, culminating at 3,207 metres above sea level.
