= Col du Granon =

Mountain pass in the French Alps

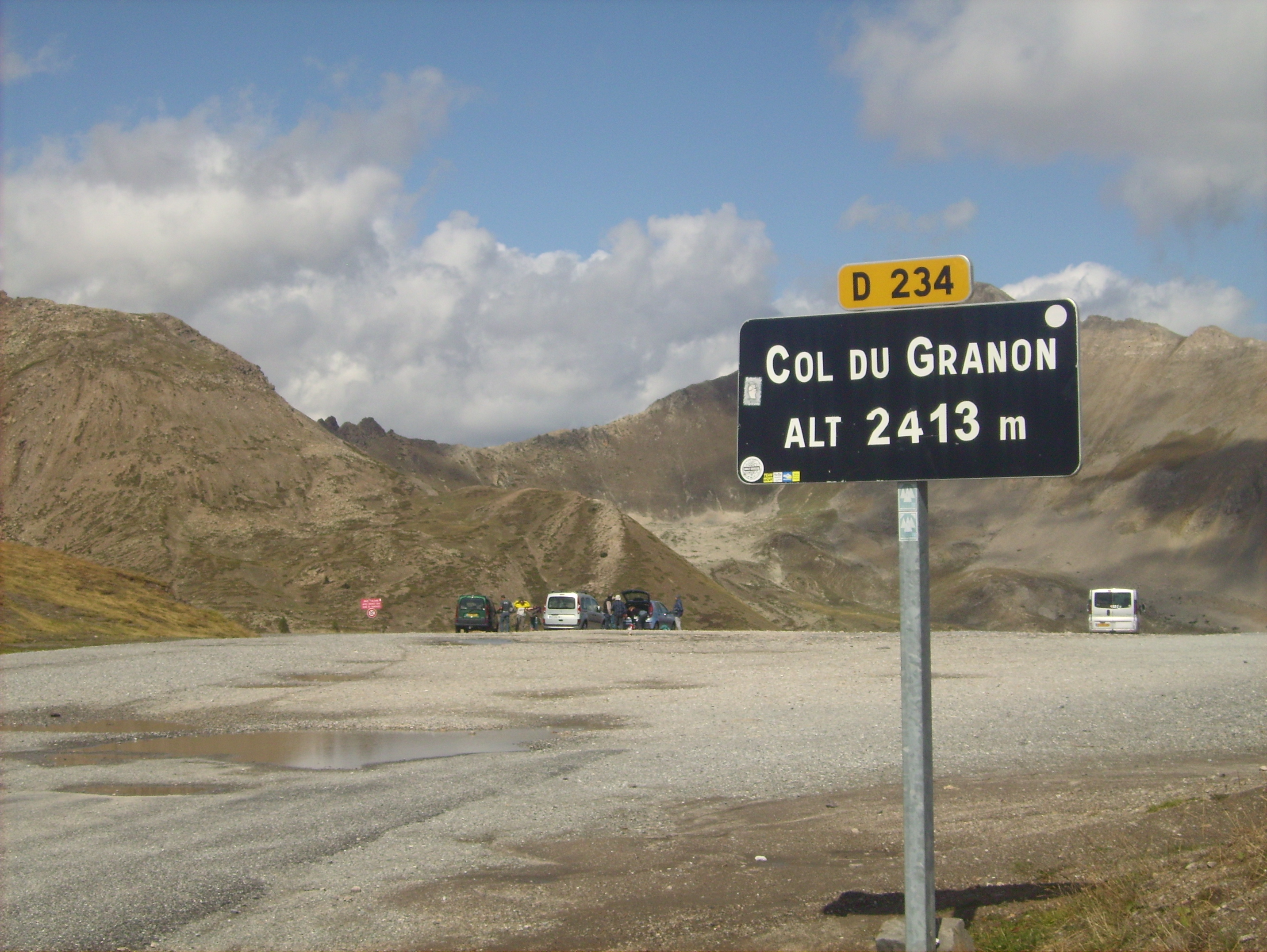
- Col du Granon

- Location within Alps
- Elevation: 2,413 metres (7,917 ft)
- Traversed by: D234T

Third Approach
- Location: Hautes-Alpes, France
- Range: Massif des Cerces (Alps)
- Coordinates: 44°57′46″N 06°36′40″E

Col du Granon (el. 2,413 m or 7,917 ft) is a high mountain pass in the Alps in the department of Hautes-Alpes in France. A narrow tarmac road winds steeply up the southern approach. Gravel roads continue beyond the pass, in a military training zone.

It hosted the highest ever mountain-top stage finish in the Tour de France—once only—in 1986, until the 2011 Tour de France, that had a finish in the Col du Galibier, at 2,645 m (8,678 ft) of altitude. Eduardo Chozas of Spain won the stage after a long lone breakaway.

During the 2022 Tour de France Team Jumbo-Visma launched a relentless attack against two-time defending champion Tadej Pogačar, using Wout van Aert, Christophe Laporte and Primož Roglič, which allowed Jonas Vingegaard to seize the yellow jersey. Like LeMond in 1986, Vingegaard would defend his lead for the rest of the race.

== Description ==
Two roads lead to the pass at 2,645 m (8,678 ft). The D234T climbs 11.5 kilometres (7.1 mi) with a 9% average gradient from Saint-Chaffrey at an altitude of 1,364 metres (4,475 ft). From the east a dirt road to the military pass at Val-des-Prés climbs 15.3 kilometres (9.5 mi) at almost 7% gradient.

== Tour de France – stage finishes ==
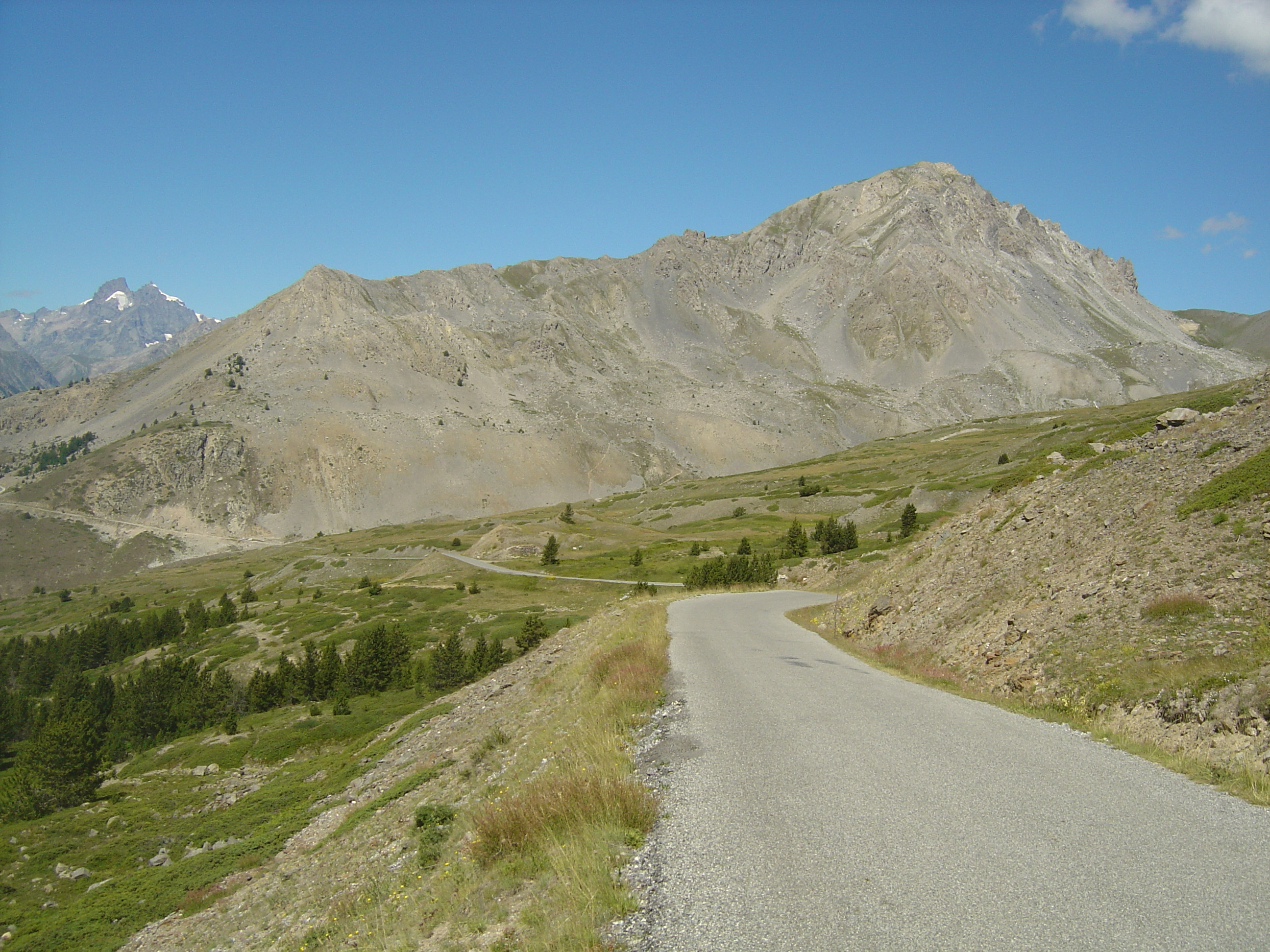
The road crossing the pass, with the Grand Aréa on the background

Year	Stage	Category	Start of stage	Distance (km)	Stage Winner	Leader in general classification
2022	11	HC	Albertville	152	Jonas Vingegaard (DEN)	Jonas Vingegaard (DEN)
1986	17	HC	Gap	190	Eduardo Chozas (ESP)	Greg LeMond (USA)

== See also ==
- List of highest paved roads in Europe
- List of mountain passes
- Ouvrage Col du Granon, part of the Alpine Line fortifications of southeastern France
