= Pic du Thabor =

- Pic du Thabor on the left, and Mont Thabor on its right

Highest point
- Elevation: 3,207 m (10,522 ft)
- Prominence: 711 m (2,333 ft)
- Listing: Alpine mountains above 3000 m
- Coordinates: 45°07′6″N 06°33′42″E

Geography
- Location within France
- Location: Savoie and Hautes-Alpes, France
- Parent range: Massif des Cerces

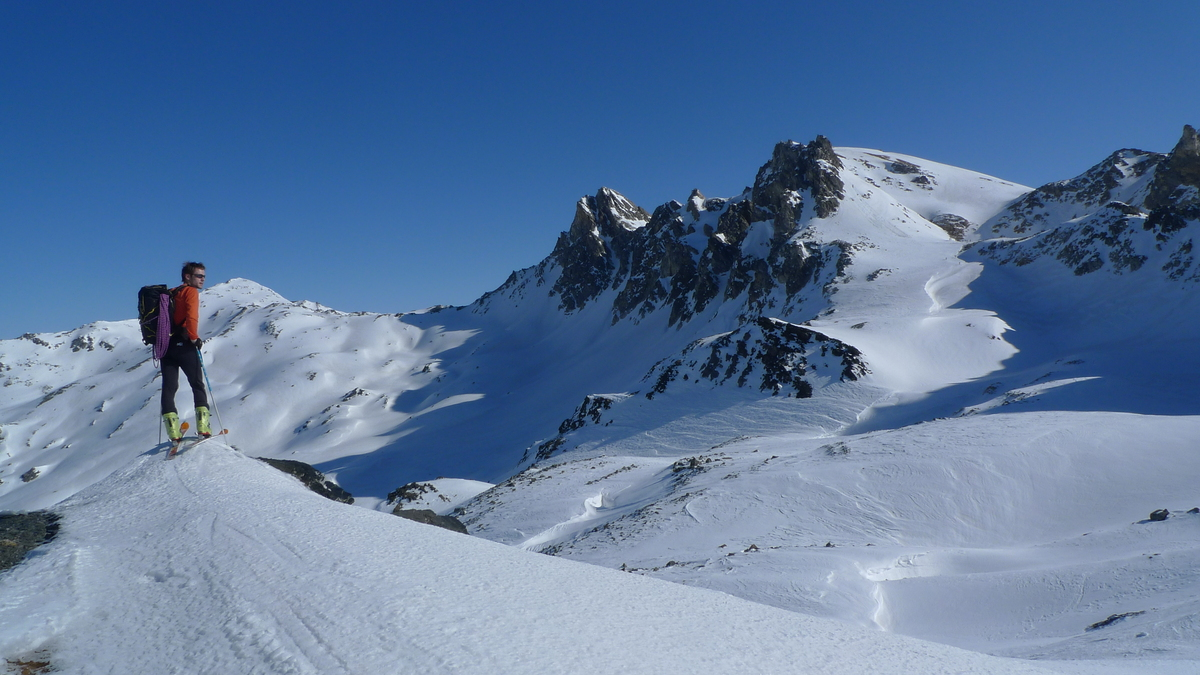
Pic du Thabor on the left, and the Mont Thabor on the right, from the col de Valmenier.

The Pic du Thabor is a mountain of Savoie and Hautes-Alpes, France. It lies in the Massif des Cerces range. It has an elevation of 3,207 metres above sea level, it stands closed to another summit, the Mont Thabor, culminating at 3,178 metres above sea level.
