= Col du Lautaret =

Mountain pass in Hautes-Alpes, France

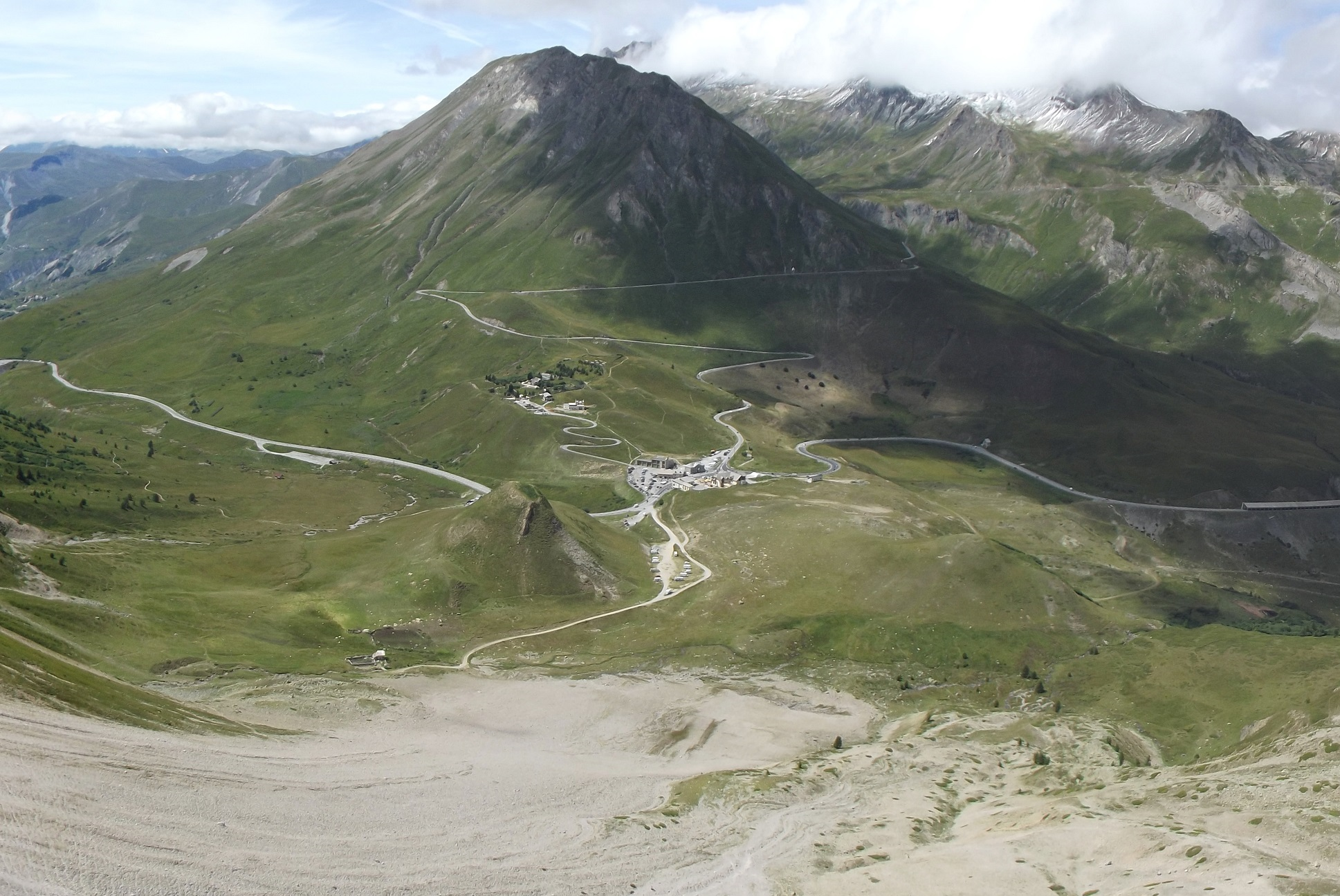
- Aerial view of Col du Lautaret

- Location within Alps
- Elevation: 2,058 m (6,752 ft)
- Traversed by: Route nationale 91

Third Approach
- Location: Hautes-Alpes, France
- Range: French Alps
- Coordinates: 45°02′04″N 06°24′18″E

Col du Lautaret (2,058 m (6,752 ft)) is a high mountain pass in the department of Hautes-Alpes in France.

It marks the boundary between the valleys of the Romanche and the Guisane, a tributary of the Durance which has its source at the col. The valleys are linked by the route départementale 1091 (formerly the national route 91) (Grenoble – Le Bourg-d'Oisans – Briançon). The Lautaret is one of the lowest points on the ridge line which separates the "north" (mainly in the Rhône-Alpes région) and "south" (mainly in the Provence-Alpes-Côte d'Azur région) geographic areas of the French Alps.

The Col has long been used as a communication route between Grenoble and Briançon, and as a step for reaching Italy across the Alps through the Col de Montgenèvre.

The Col is open all year round and provides good views of La Meije to the south-west and the Grand Galibier to the north. It is also well known for its botanical garden managed by the Université Grenoble Alpes. The route to the south side of the Col du Galibier leaves from the Lautaret.

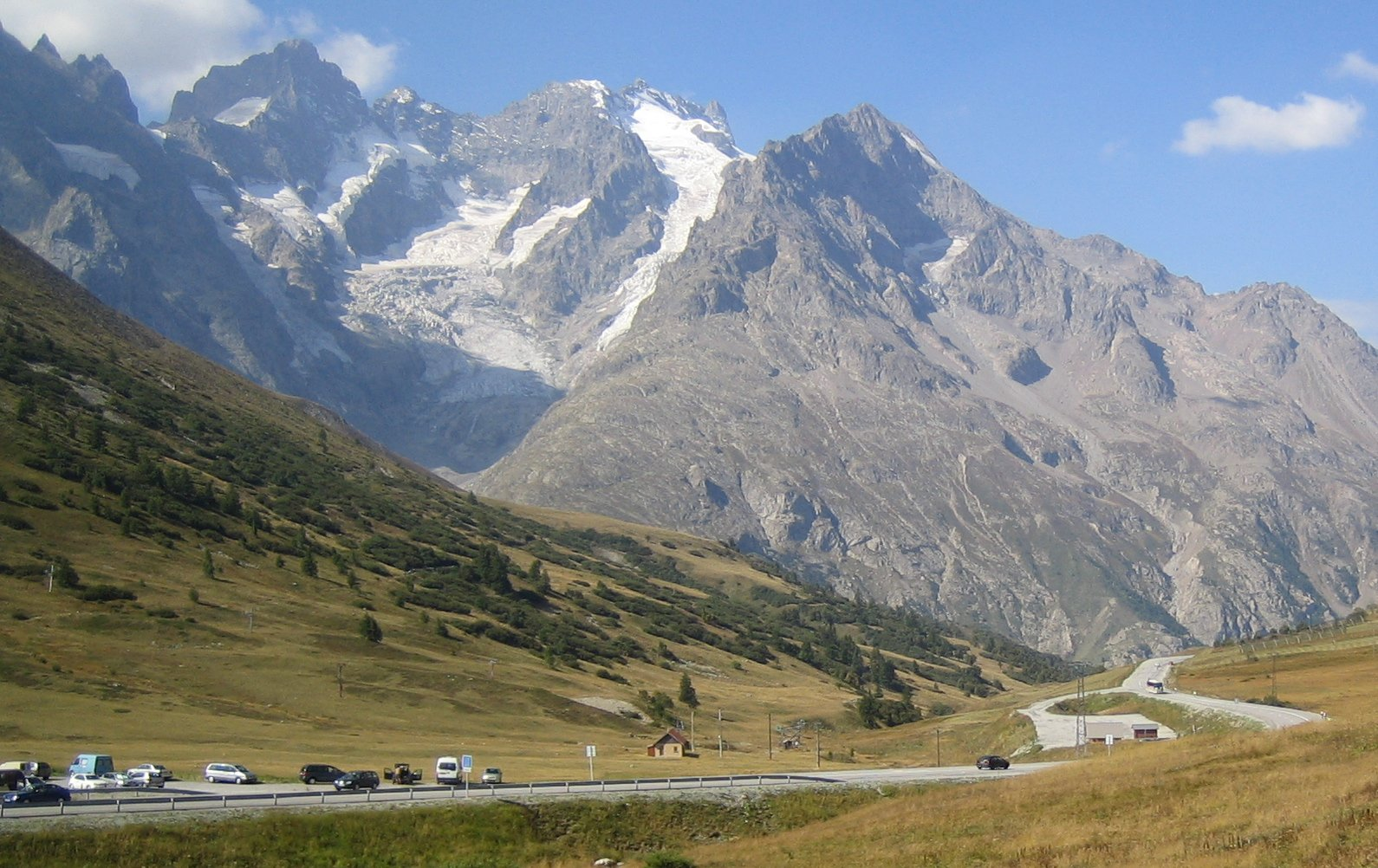
Route Nationale 91 at Col du Lautaret

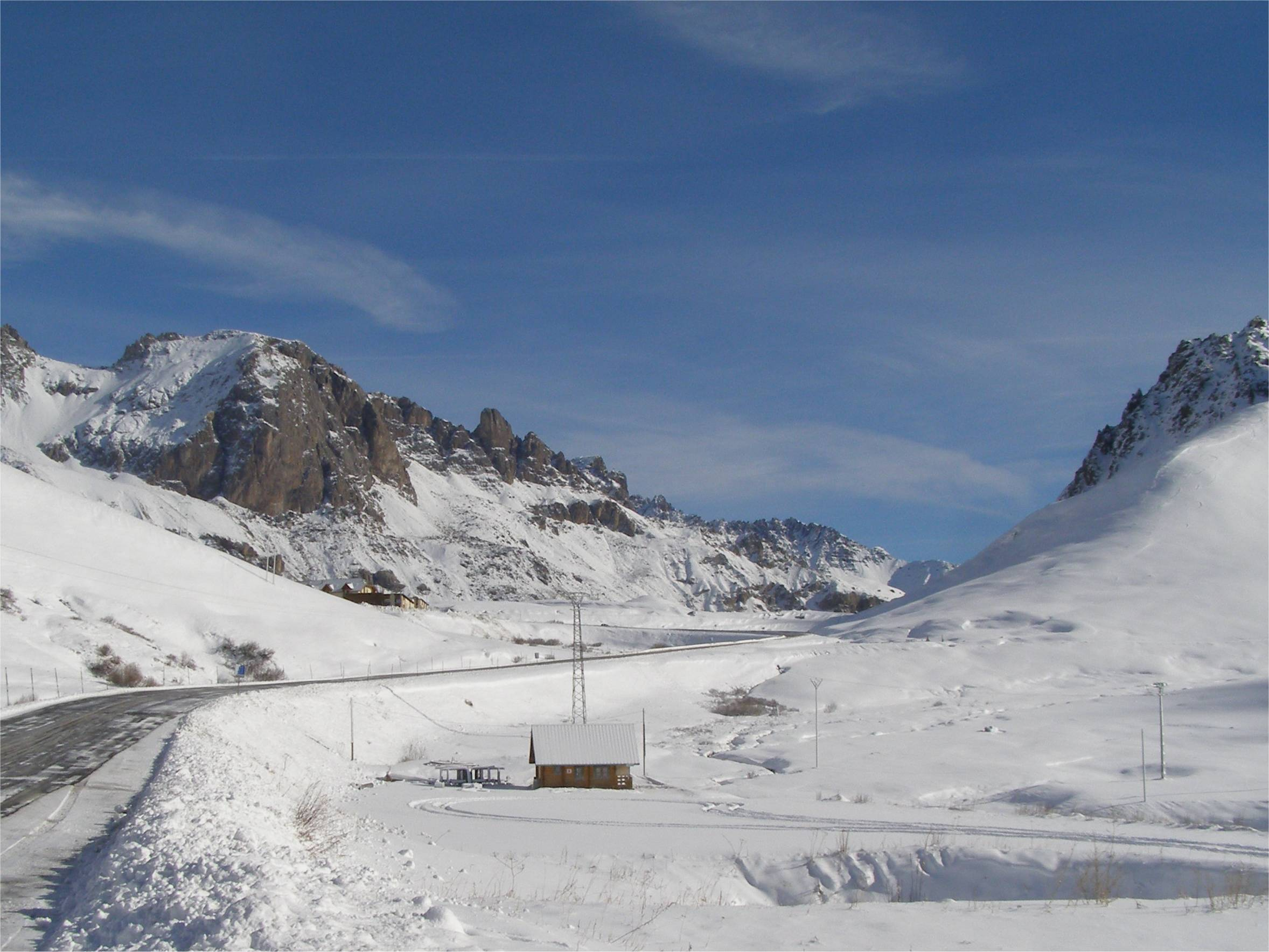
Col du Lautaret in the late Autumn

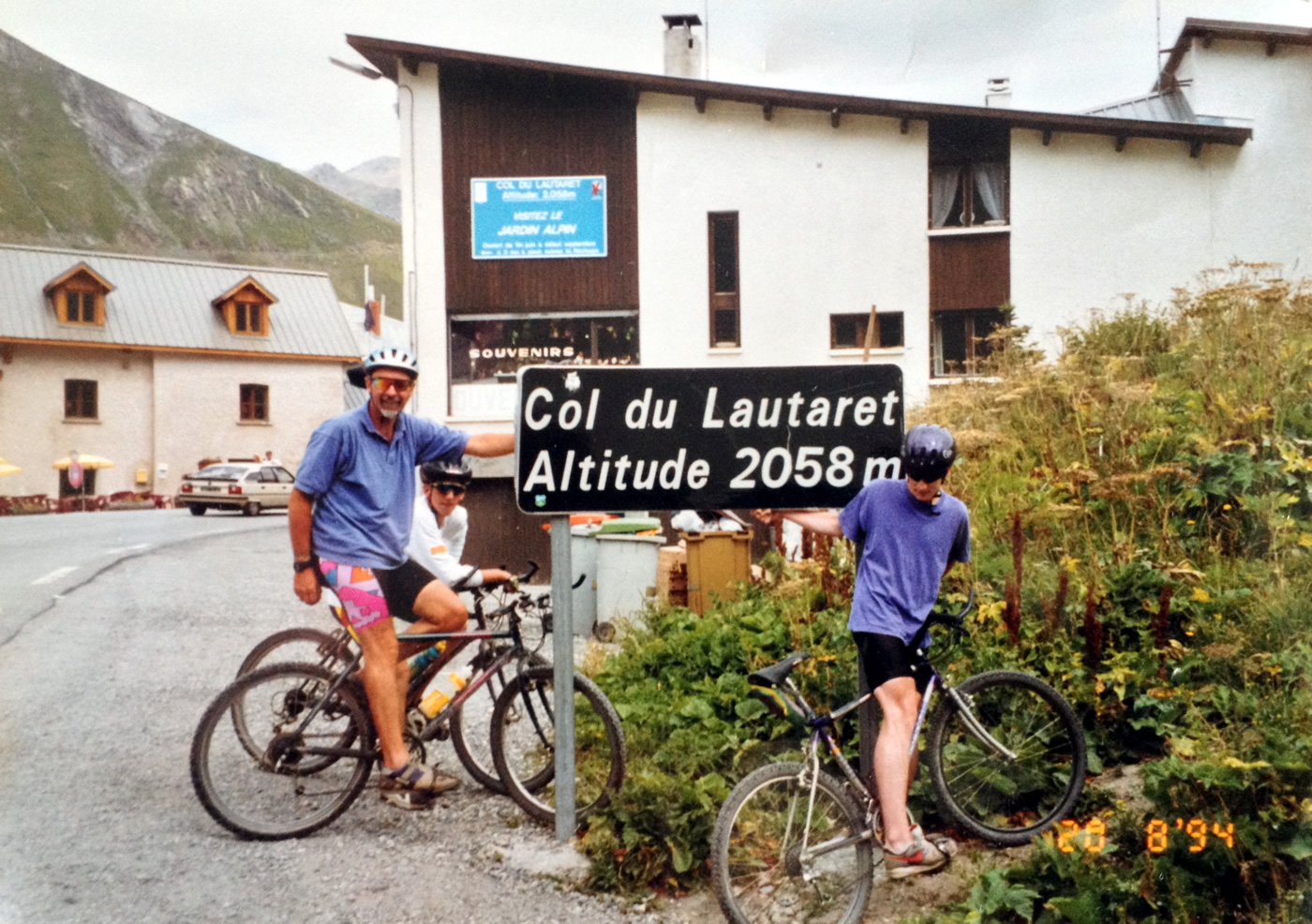
Col Du Lautaret 1994

== Cycle racing ==
=== Details of the climbs ===
From the west, the climb starts at Les Clapier, near Le Bourg-d'Oisans, from where the climb is 34.1 km (21.2 mi) long, gaining 1,312 m (4,304 ft) in altitude, at an average gradient of 3.8%, with the steepest section being at 8.1% in the first kilometre.

The eastern approach commences at Briançon, from where there is 27.7 km (17.2 mi) to the summit, gaining 853 m (2,799 ft) in altitude, at an average gradient of 3.1%, with a maximum of 7.5%.

=== Tour de France ===
The Tour de France first crossed over the Col du Lautaret in 1911, when the leader over the summit was Émile Georget. Since 1947, the Lautaret pass has been crossed over 40 times by the Tour de France, although most of these have not been classified for the "King of the Mountains" competition, usually when the pass is crossed on the descent from the Col du Galibier.

=== Appearances in Tour de France ===
Since 1947, the passages which have been categorized have been:

Year	Stage	Category	Start	Finish	Leader at the summit
2014	14	1	Grenoble	Risoul	Joaquim Rodríguez (ESP)
2006	15	2	Gap	Alpe d'Huez	David de la Fuente (ESP)
2003	9	1	Le Bourg-d'Oisans	Gap	Danilo Di Luca (ITA)
1972	14a	3	Briançon	Valloire	Joaquim Agostinho (POR)
1965	17	3	Briançon	Aix-les-Bains	Francisco Gabica (ESP)
1962	19	3	Briançon	Aix-les-Bains	Juan Campillo (ESP)
1960	17	3	Briançon	Aix-les-Bains	Jean Graczyk (FRA)
1958	21	3	Briançon	Aix-les-Bains	Piet Van Est (NED)
1953	19	2	Briançon	Lyon	Jean Le Guilly (FRA)
1951	21	3	Briançon	Aix-les-Bains	Gino Sciardis (ITA)
1950	19	2	Briançon	Saint-Étienne	Apo Lazaridès (FRA)

=== Appearances in Vuelta a España ===
The col will be used in Stage 4 of the 2025 Vuelta a España.

Year	Stage	Category	Start	Finish	Leader at the summit
2025	4	2	Susa	Voiron	Sean Quinn (USA)

== See also ==
- Souvenir Henri Desgrange
