= Jardin botanique alpin du Lautaret =

Botanical garden in Hautes-Alpes, France

Coordinates: 45.0360°N 6.4002°E

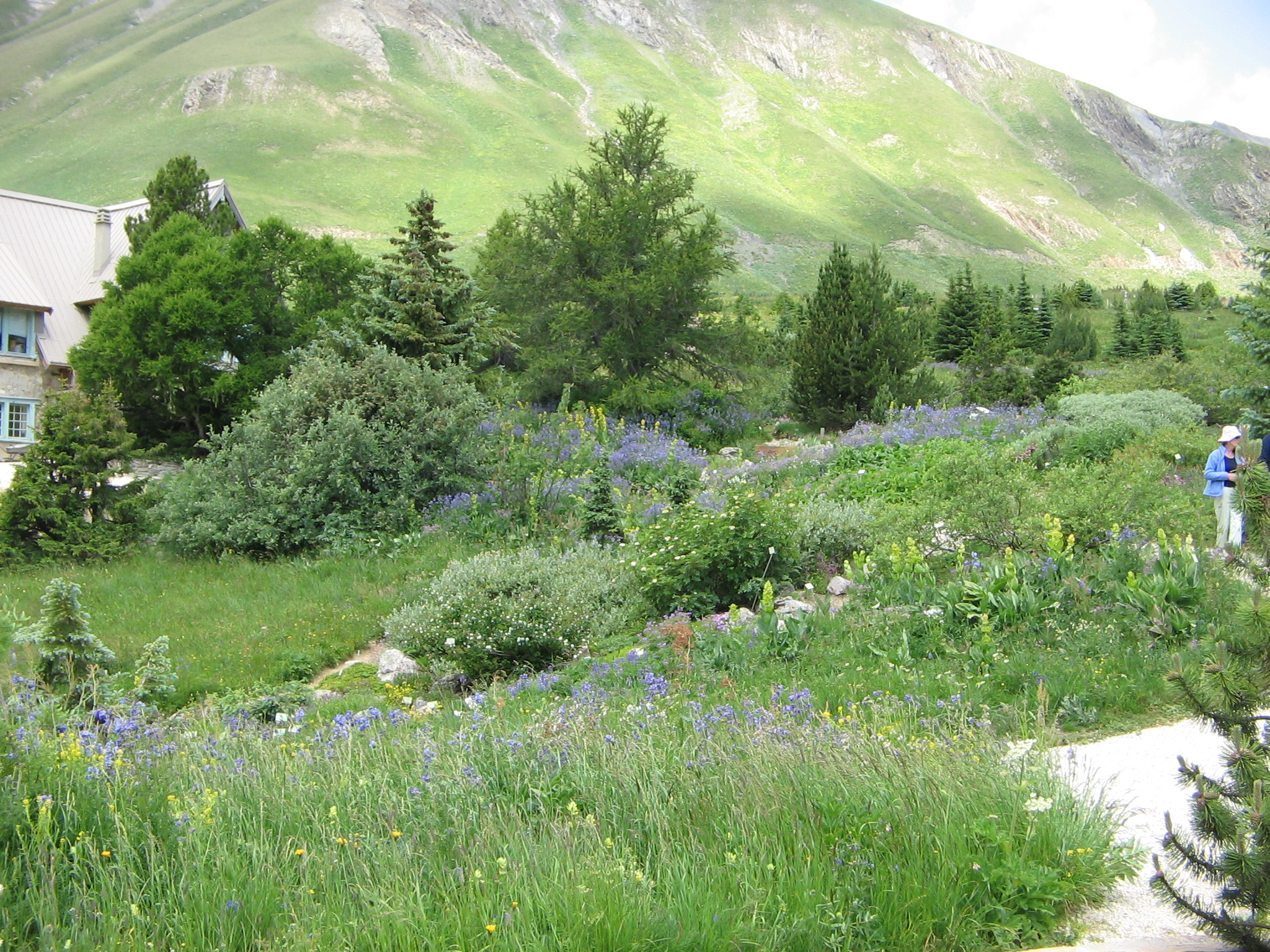

The Lautaret Alpine Garden (Jardin botanique alpin du Lautaret) (2 hectares) is an alpine botanical garden located at 2100 metres altitude in the Col du Lautaret of the Dauphiné Alps, near Villar-d'Arêne, Hautes-Alpes, Provence-Alpes-Côte d'Azur, France. It is part of the List of Remarkable Gardens of France certified by the Ministry of Culture (France).

The garden contains more than 2,300 species of alpine plants from around the world and a herbarium of 15 000 plants collected over the last 150 years. Plants are presented in rockeries (4500 m²) corresponding to four major themes: geographical origin, habitat, properties, and taxonomy.

The garden was created in 1899 by combined effort of the Touring Club de France, Professor Jean-Paul Lachmann of the Université scientifique de Grenoble, and M. Bonnabel, local hotelier. It was moved in 1919 to make way for a new road, and is now sited with excellent views of the Meije glaciers. The garden was abandoned during World War II, subsequently restored by Robert Ruffier-Lanche, declined again after his death in 1973, and revived in the early 1980s. In 1998 it was recognized by the Conservatoire des Collections Végétales Spécialisées (CCVS), and in 2005 it became a part of the Joseph Fourier Alpine Station.

Joseph Fourier Alpine Station is a research and teaching institution of the university. The garden thus serves as a field base for scientific research, Masters and PhD programs, and field internships. Among its facilities the garden has two chalets for researchers and equipment, a research lab, a workshop, an experimental garden and an experimental nursery. An Alpine Gallery was constructed in 2016 to expand additional space for visitors and researchers.

The garden is also open to general public in the warmer months; an admission fee is charged.

The garden has always operated under the auspices of the University of Grenoble and its successor organizations, namely:

- University of Grenoble (1899-1970)
- Université scientifique et médicale de Grenoble (1970-1980)
- Université scientifique, technologique et médicale de Grenoble (1980-1987)
- Joseph Fourier University (1987-2015)
- Université Grenoble Alpes (2016-)
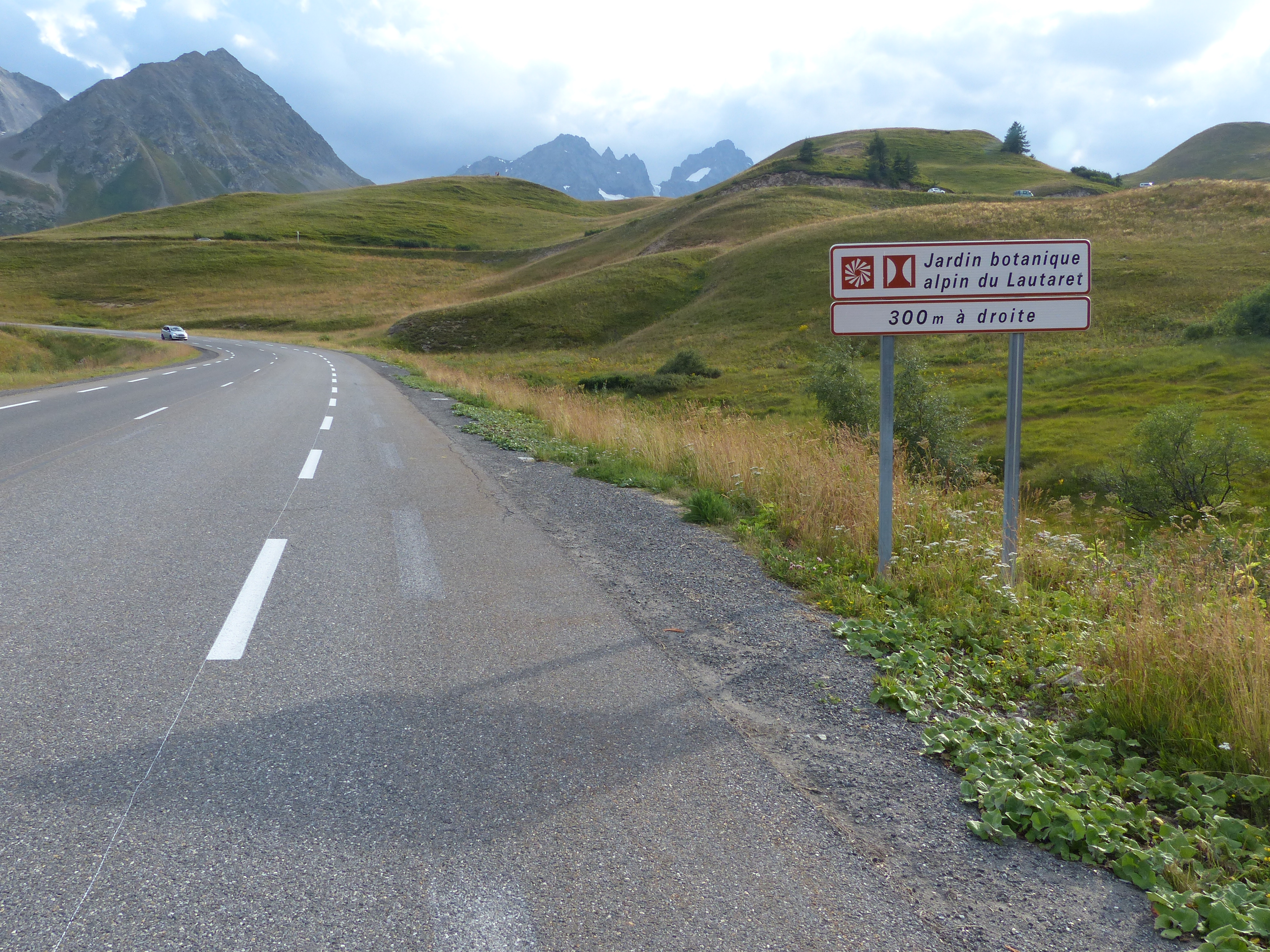
Entrance

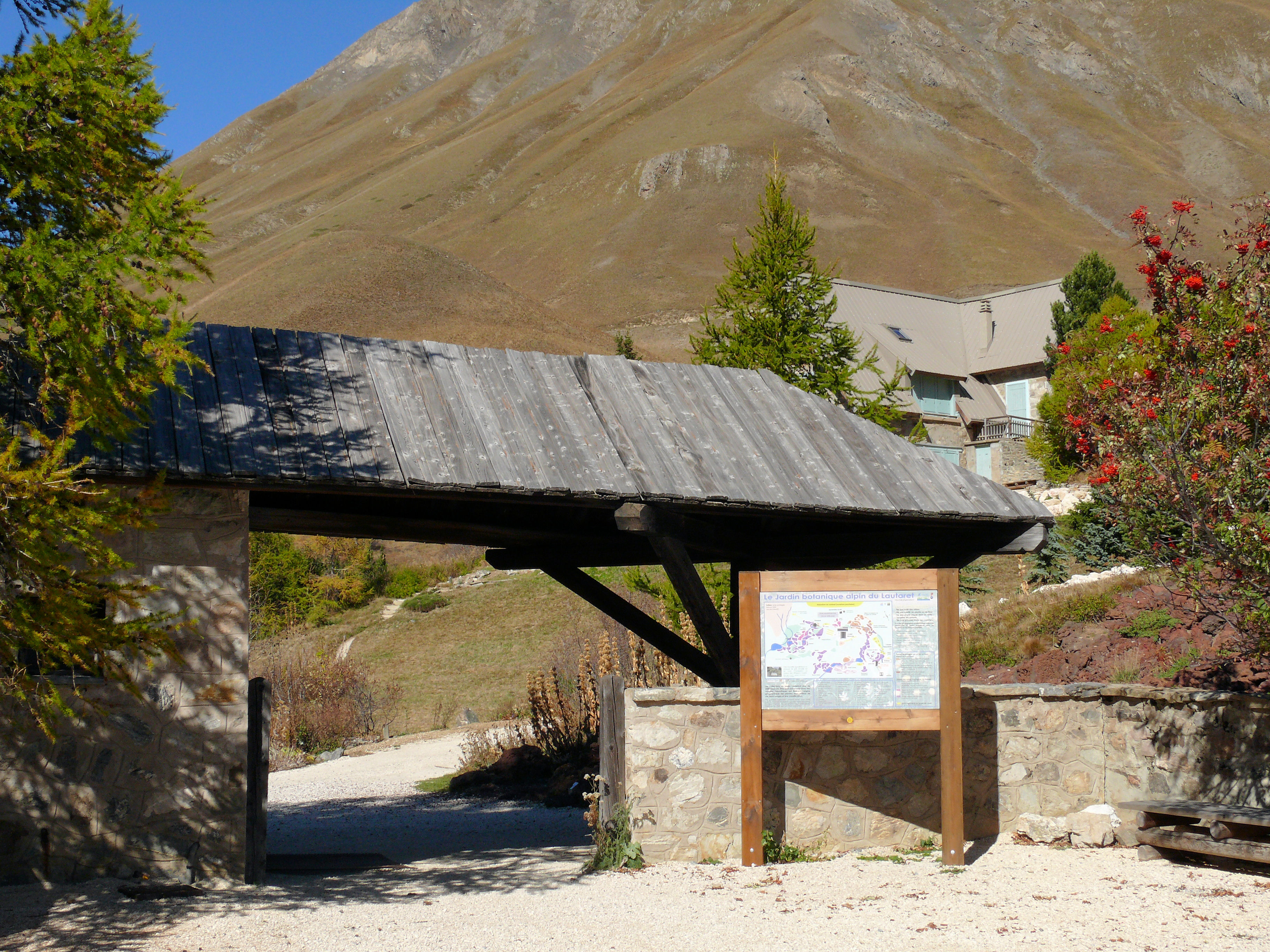
Garden gates

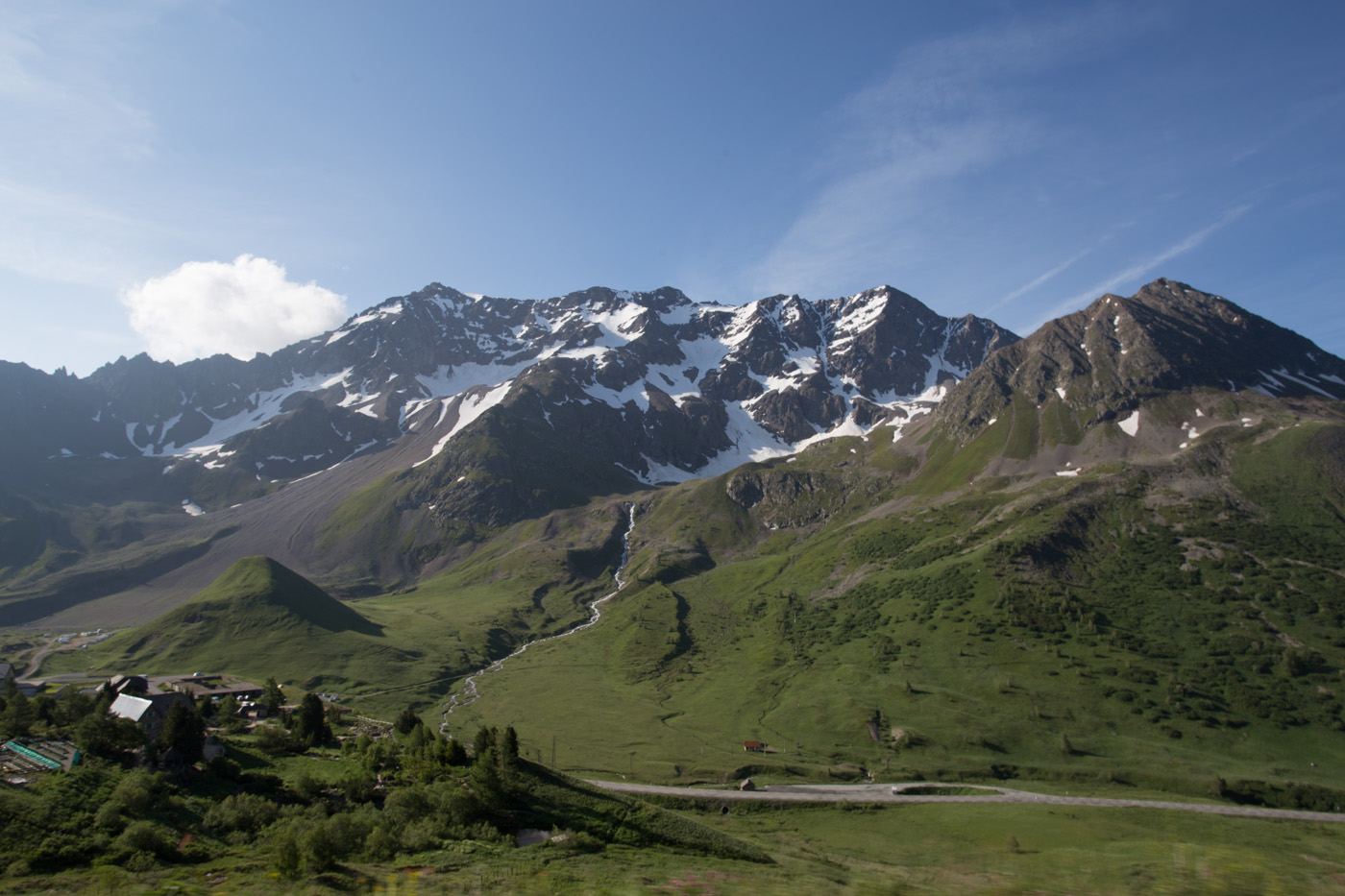
Col du Lautaret

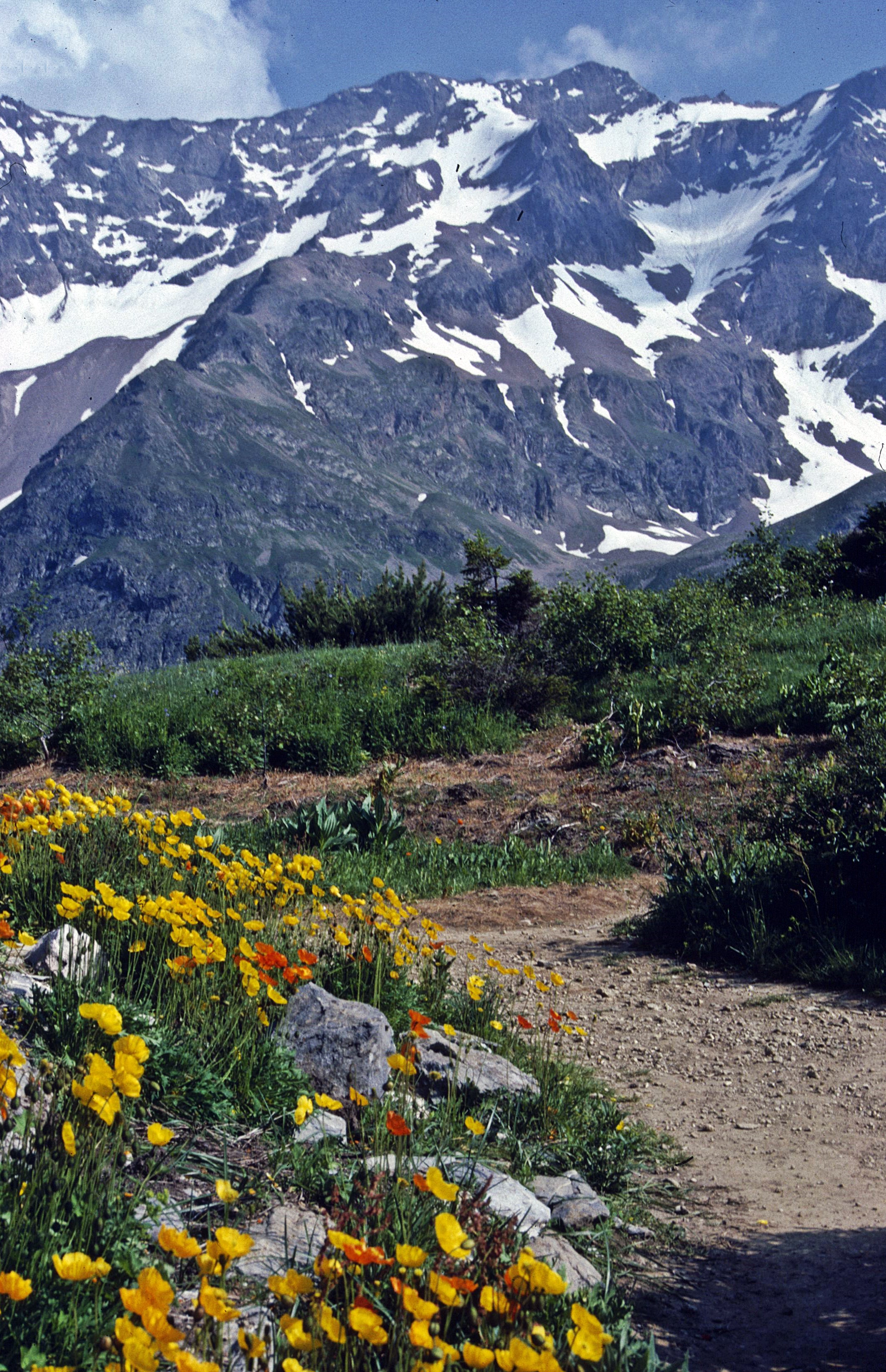
In the Garden

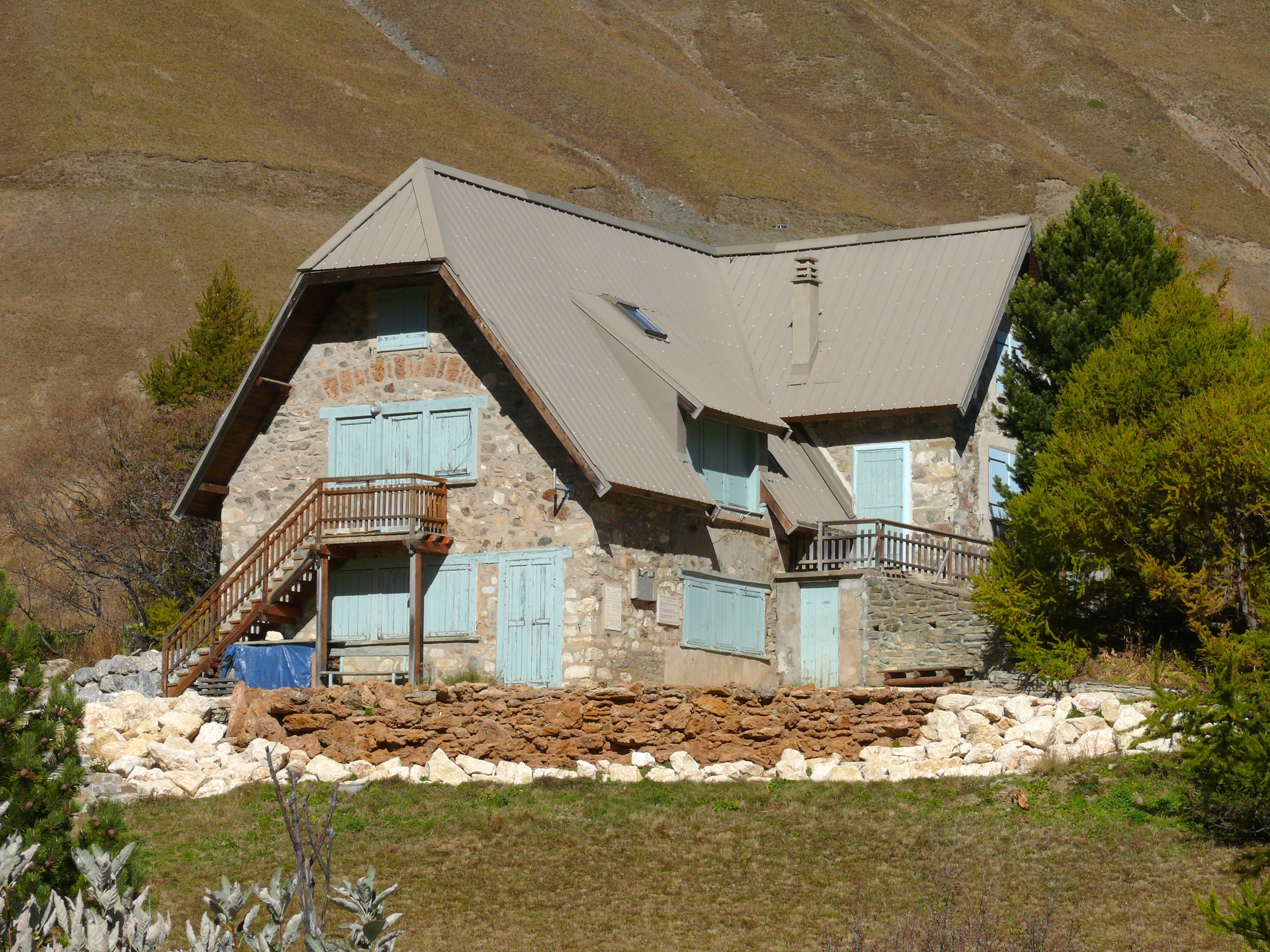
Chalet Miranda for projects teams

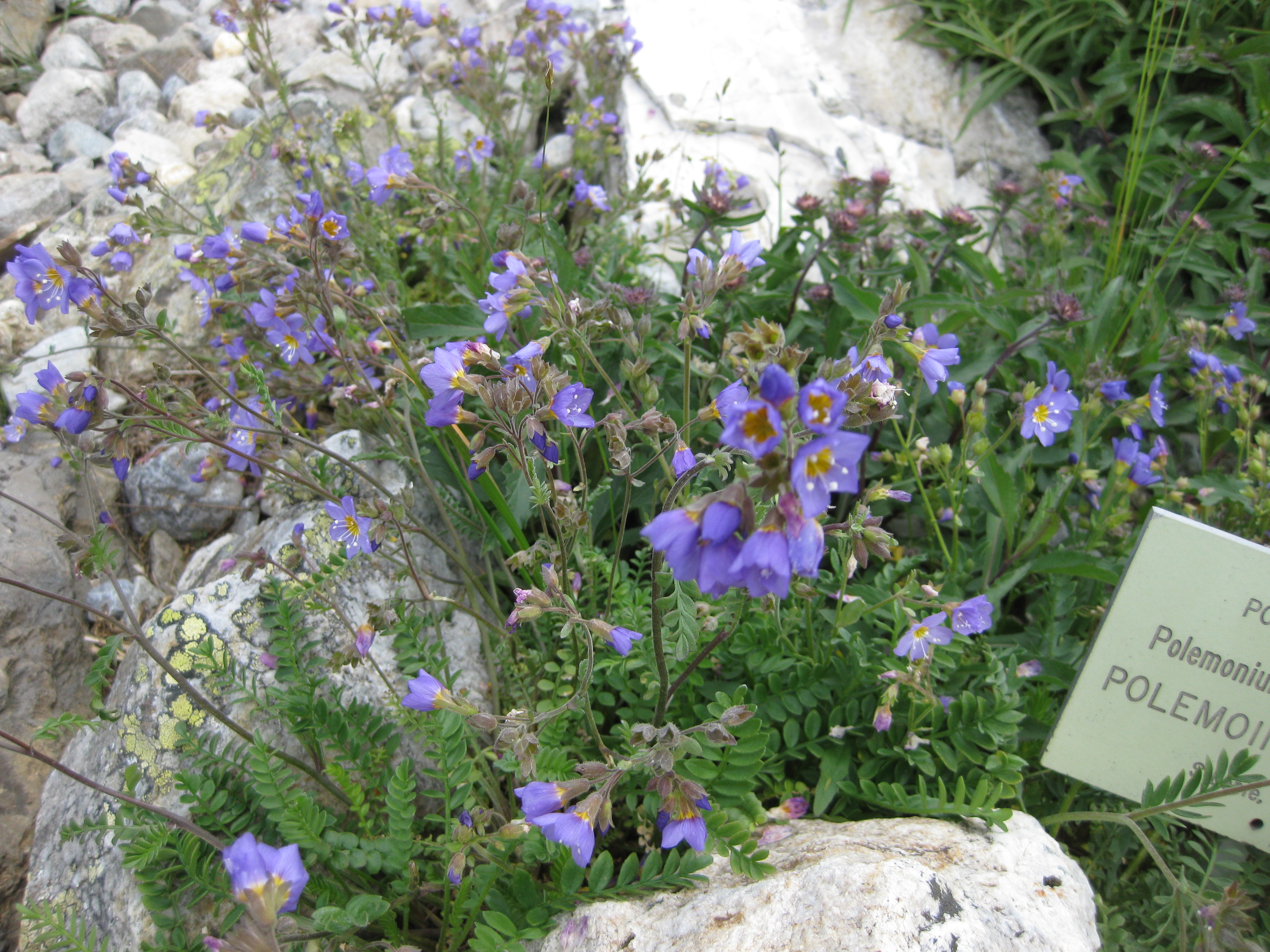
Rare arctic Polemonium boreale

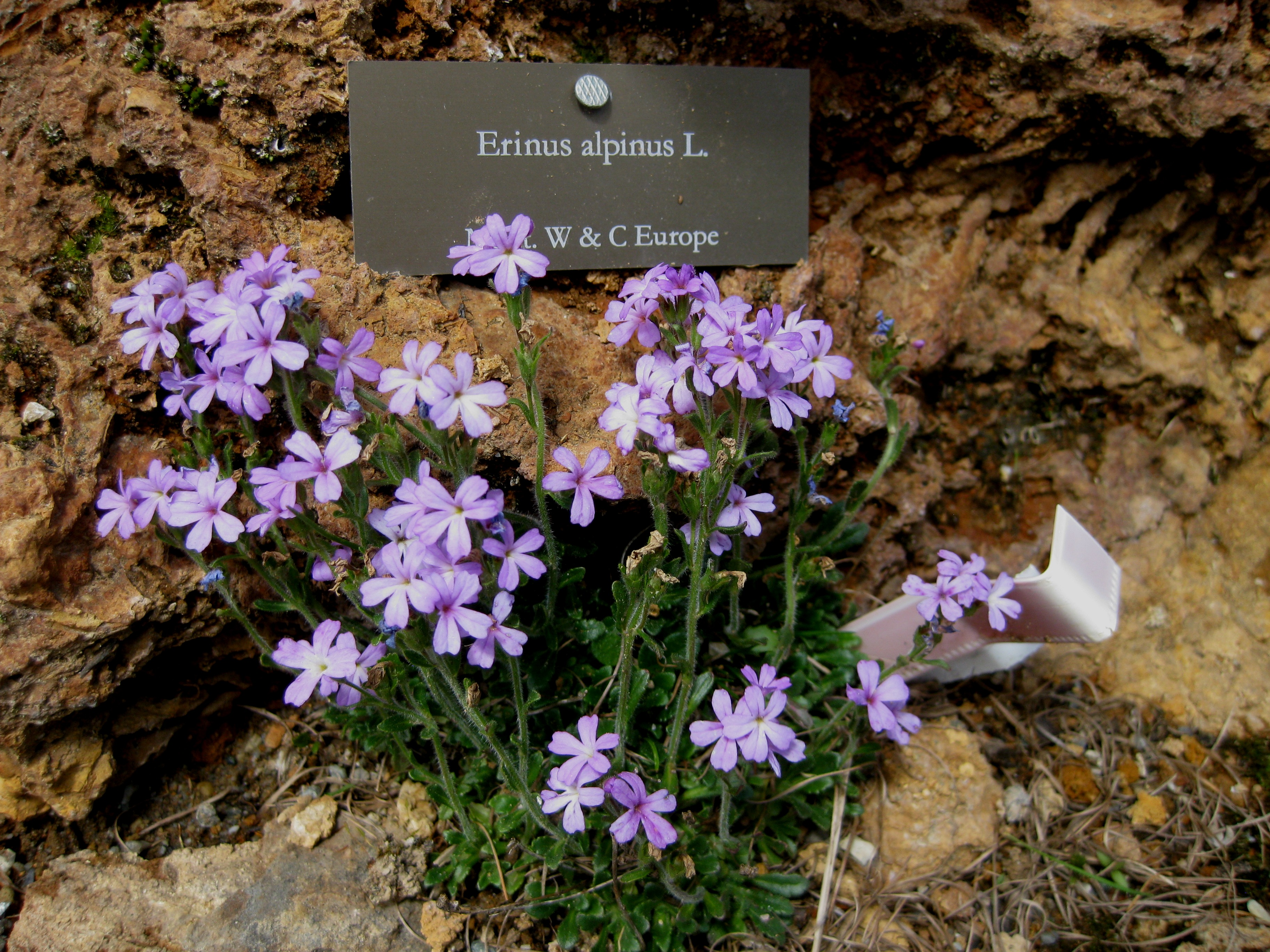
Erinus alpinus

== See also ==
- List of botanical gardens in France
