= Col du Galibier =

Mountain pass in France

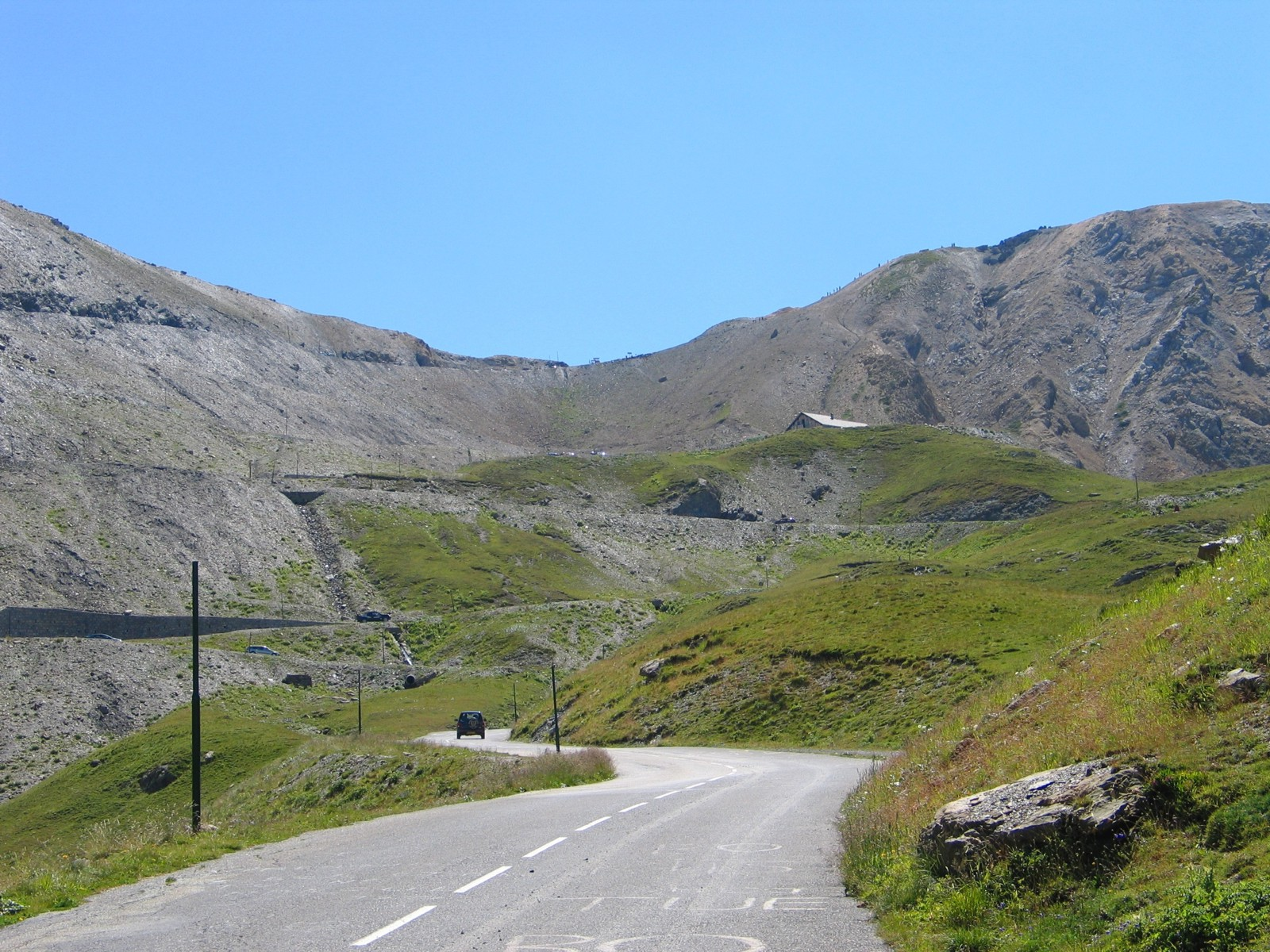
- Col du Galibier (North view)

- Location within Alps
- Elevation: 2,642 m (8,668 ft)
- Traversed by: D902B

Third Approach
- Location: Savoie/Hautes-Alpes, France
- Range: Graian Alps
- Coordinates: 45°03′50.4″N 06°24′28.8″E

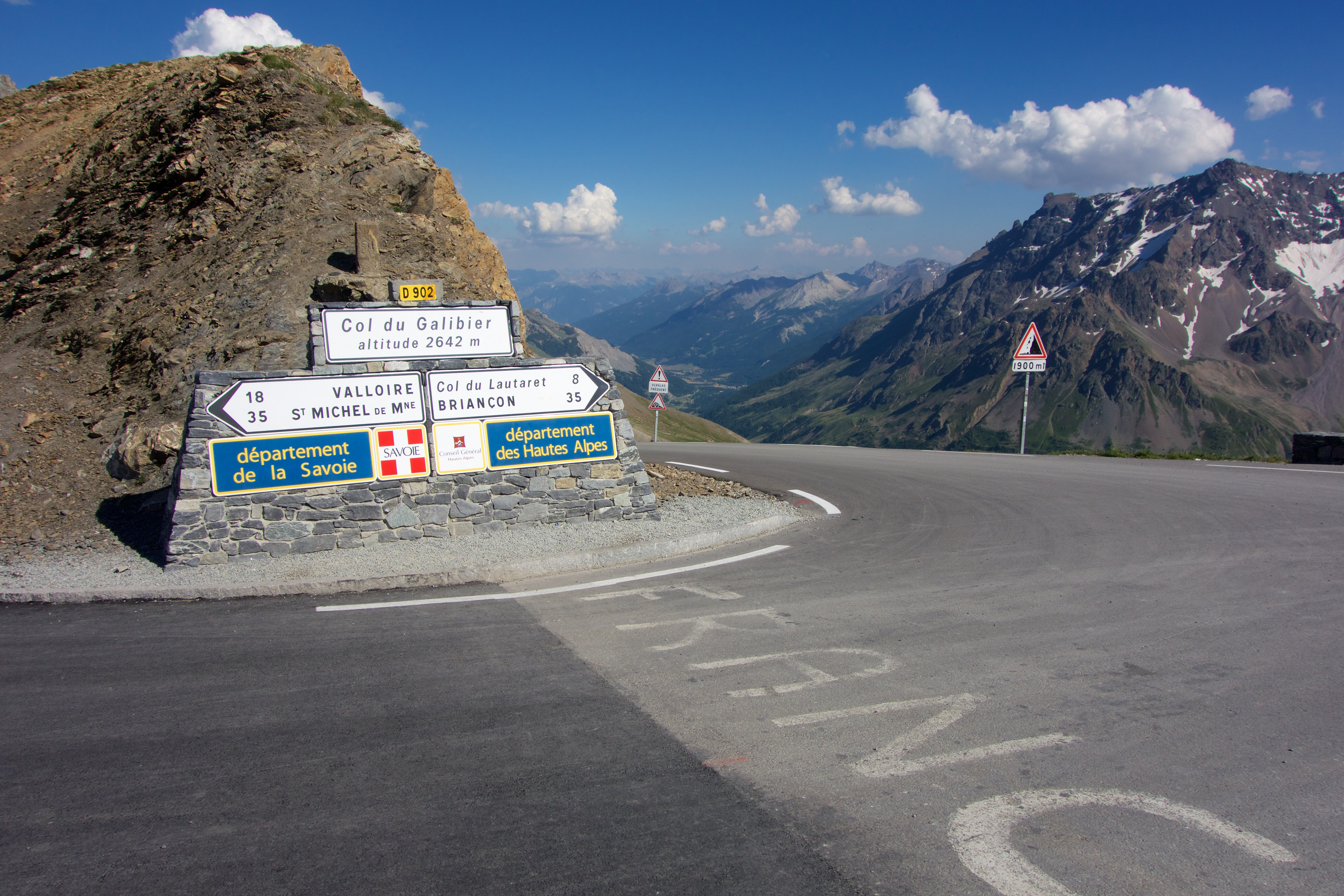
Signpost at the Col du Galibier

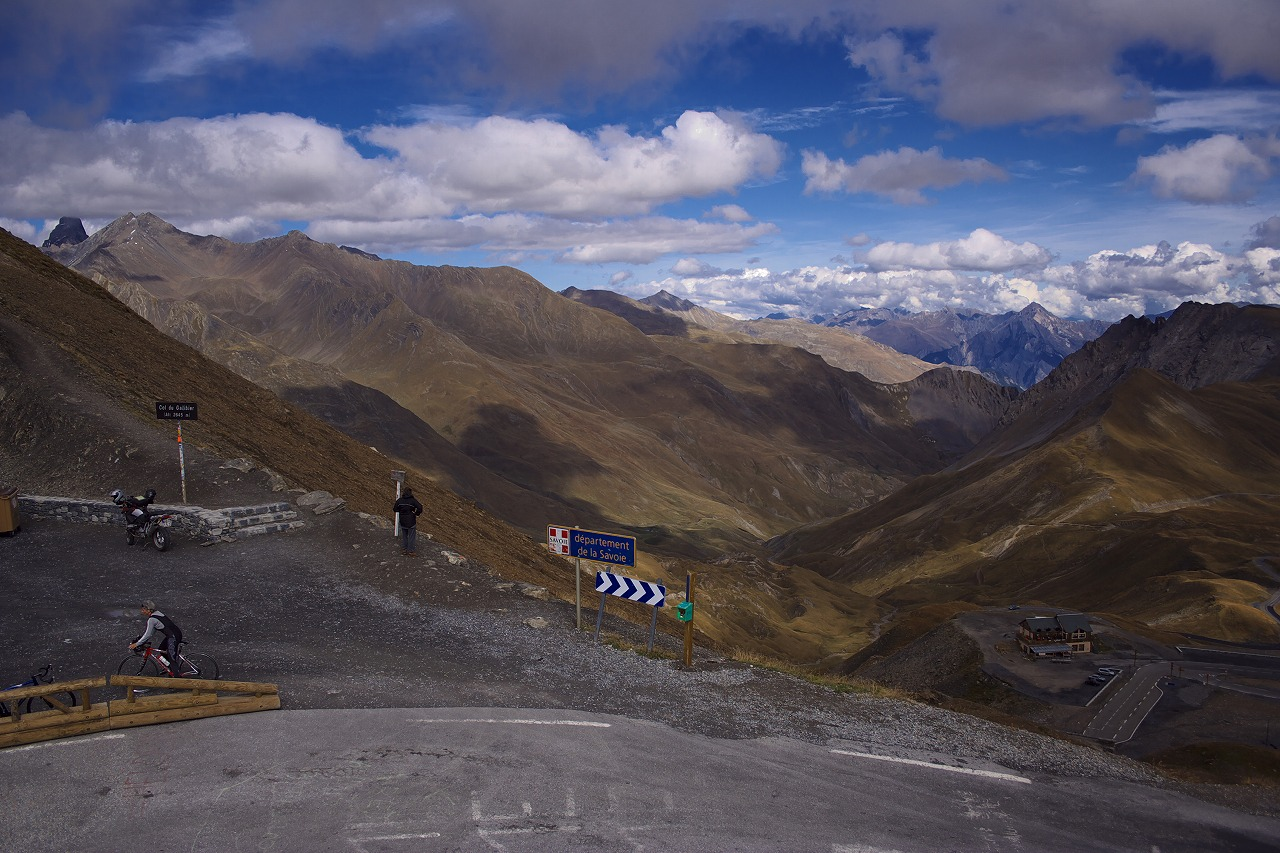
Col du Galibier (view of the northern side)

The Col du Galibier (el. 2,642 metres (8,668 ft)) is a mountain pass in the southern region of the French Dauphiné Alps near Grenoble. It is the eighth highest paved road in the Alps, and recurrently the highest point of the Tour de France.

It connects Saint-Michel-de-Maurienne and Briançon via the col du Télégraphe and the Col du Lautaret. The pass is closed during the winter. It is located between the massif d'Arvan-Villards and the massif des Cerces, taking its name from the secondary chain of mountains known as the Galibier.

Before 1976, the tunnel was the only point of passage at the top, at an altitude of 2556 m. The tunnel was closed for restoration until 2002, and a new road was constructed over the summit. The re-opened tunnel is a single lane controlled by traffic lights, which are among the highest such installations in Europe.

== History ==
In 1876 the first passable road was opened between Maurienne and Briançon in the Oisans region. In the north the pass road begins in Valloire, only reachable via the Col du Télégraphe which is before Galibier and connects Saint-Michel-de-Maurienne with Valloire. In the south, the road begins at a level of 2,057 m Col du Lautaret, which connects Grenoble in the west with Briançon in the east. The highest point of this road was at an altitude of 2,658 m, 16 meters higher than nowadays. The road between Col du Lautaret is 24,5 kilometers long, 16 kilometers is the northern part, 8,5 kilometers is the south part. The road over the Galibier was first a natural road, later asphalted.

== Construction and opening of tunnel ==
The area of the summit was a difficult passage, therefore, in 1890, a 363-meter-long tunnel was built, which was opened in 1891. This tunnel is four meters wide, allowing only for the passage of vehicles in one direction at a time.

== Details of the climb ==
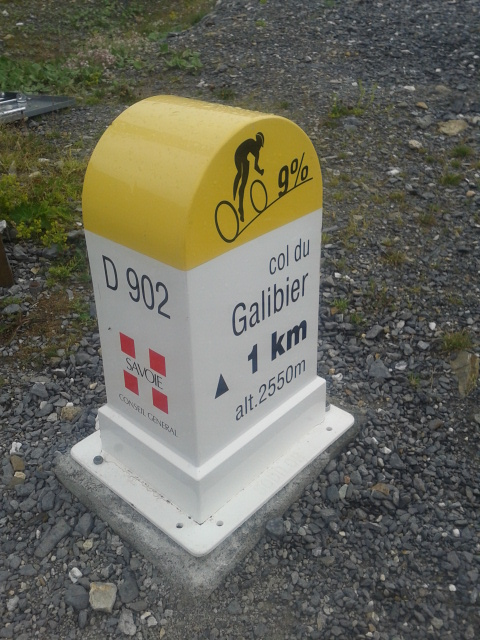
The last mountain pass cycling milestones along the climb from Valloire

From the north, starting at Saint-Michel-de-Maurienne (including the Col du Télégraphe), the climb is 34.8 kilometres (21.6 mi) long, gaining 2,120 metres (6,960 ft) in height (an average of 6.1%). The actual climb to the summit starts at Valloire and is 18.1 kilometres (11.2 mi) long at an average of 6.9% (height gain: 1,245 metres (4,085 ft)). The maximum gradient is 10.1% at the summit.

From the south, the climb starts from the Col du Lautaret (el. 2,058 metres (6,752 ft)) and is 8.5 kilometres (5.3 mi) long at an average gradient of 6.9% (height gain: 585 metres (1,919 ft)) with a maximum of 12.1% at the summit.

On the south side there are currently, 16 June 2026, no kilometre markers between the Lautaret and the summit. (The previous statement that "On both sides of the Col du Galibier, mountain pass cycling milestones are placed every kilometre." needs checking on the North side) They indicate the distance to the summit, the current altitude, and the average slope in the following kilometre.

== The Tour de France ==
The Col du Galibier was first used in the Tour de France in 1911; the first rider over the summit was Emile Georget, who, with Paul Duboc and Gustave Garrigou were the only riders not to walk.

The original summit was at 2556 m.; while the tunnel was closed from 1976 until 2002, the tour route went only over the pass closer to the mountain peak at 2645 m. In 2011, the Tour de France went through the tunnel for the first time during the 19th stage from Modane Valfréjus to L'Alpe d'Huez.

At the south portal of the tunnel, at the edge of the road, there is a monument to Henri Desgrange, instigator and first director of the Tour de France. The memorial was inaugurated when the tour passed on 19 July 1949. Whenever the tour crosses the Col du Galibier, a wreath is laid on the memorial. The Souvenir Henri Desgrange is awarded to the first rider across the summit of the highest mountain in each year's tour. In 2006, the prize of 5,000 euros was claimed on the Col du Galibier by Michael Rasmussen.

Since 1947, the Col de Galibier has been crossed 31 times by the Tour de France. It was scheduled to be used in 1996, but was left out at the last minute due to bad weather. As a result of snow on both the Col de l'Iseran and the Col du Galibier, the scheduled 190 km stage from Val-d'Isère to Sestriere in Italy was reduced to a 46 km sprint from Le-Monetier-les-Bains which was claimed by Bjarne Riis, resulting in him taking the yellow jersey which he retained to the finish in Paris.

In the 2008 Tour, the Col du Galibier had been crossed on 23 July in the 210 km stage 17 from Embrun to Alpe d'Huez.

The 2011 Tour climbed the Col du Galibier twice to celebrate the 100th anniversary of the first appearance of the pass in the Tour de France, including the first ever summit finish, won by Andy Schleck after a 60 km solo breakaway. This was the highest ever stage finish in the Tour de France. It was scheduled to be used again in stage 20 of the 2015 Tour, but was left out nine days before the race start due to landslides in the Chambon Tunnel, situated towards the bottom of the descent of the climb. It was also used twice, on stages 11 and 12, of the 2022 Tour.

=== Appearances in the Tour de France (since 1947) ===
Year	Stage	Category	Start	Finish	Leader at the summit
1947	8	1	Grenoble	Briançon	Fermo Camellini (ITA)
1948	14	2	Briançon	Aix-les-Bains	Lucien Teisseire (FRA)
1952	11	1	Le Bourg-d'Oisans	Sestrières	Fausto Coppi (ITA)
1954	19	1	Briançon	Aix-les-Bains	Federico Bahamontes (ESP)
1955	8	1	Thonon-les-Bains	Briançon	Charly Gaul (LUX)
1957	10	1	Thonon-les-Bains	Briançon	Marcel Janssens (BEL)
1959	18	2	Grenoble	St-Vincent-d'Aoste	Charly Gaul (LUX)
1964	8	1	Thonon-les-Bains	Briançon	Federico Bahamontes (ESP)
1966	16	1	Le Bourg-d'Oisans	Briançon	Julio Jiménez (ESP)
1967	10	1	Divonne-les-Bains	Briançon	Julio Jiménez (ESP)
1969	10	1	Chamonix	Briançon	Eddy Merckx (BEL)
1972	14a	1	Briançon	Valloire	Joop Zoetemelk (NED)
1973	8	1	Moûtiers	Les Orres	Luis Ocaña (ESP)
1974	11	1	Aix-les-Bains	Serre-Chevalier	Vicente Lopez-Carril (ESP)
1979	17	HC	Les Menuires	Alpe d'Huez	Lucien Van Impe (BEL)
1980	17	HC	Serre-Chevalier	Morzine	Johan De Muynck (BEL)
1984	18	HC	Alpe d'Huez	La Plagne	Francisco Rodríguez (COL)
1986	18	HC	Briançon	Alpe d'Huez	Luis Herrera (COL)
1987	21	HC	Le Bourg-d'Oisans	La Plagne	Pedro Muñoz (ESP)
1989	17	HC	Briançon	Alpe d'Huez	Gert-Jan Theunisse (NED)
1992	14	HC	Sestrières	Alpe d'Huez	Franco Chioccioli (ITA)
1993	10	HC	Villard-de-Lans	Serre-Chevalier	Tony Rominger (SUI)
1998	15	HC	Grenoble	Les Deux Alpes	Marco Pantani (ITA)
1999	9	HC	Le Grand-Bornand	Sestrières	José Luis Arrieta (ESP)
2000	15	HC	Briançon	Courchevel	Pascal Hervé (FRA)
2002	16	HC	Les Deux Alpes	La Plagne	Santiago Botero (COL)
2003	8	HC	Sallanches	Alpe d'Huez	Stefano Garzelli (ITA)
2005	11	HC	Courchevel	Briançon	Alexander Vinokourov (KAZ)
2006	16	HC	Le Bourg-d'Oisans	La Toussuire	Michael Rasmussen (DEN)
2007	9	HC	Val-d'Isère	Briançon	Mauricio Soler (COL)
2008	17	HC	Embrun	Alpe d'Huez	Rémy Di Gregorio (FRA)
2011	18	HC	Pinerolo	Col du Galibier	Andy Schleck (LUX)
2011	19	HC	Modane	Alpe d'Huez	Andy Schleck (LUX)
2017	17	HC	La Mure	Serre-Chevalier	Primož Roglič (SLO)
2019	18	HC	Embrun	Valloire	Nairo Quintana (COL)
2022	11	HC	Albertville	Col du Granon	Warren Barguil (FRA)
2022	12	HC	Briançon	Alpe d'Huez	Anthony Perez (FRA)
2024	4	HC	Pinerolo	Valloire	Tadej Pogačar (SLO)
2026	20	HC	Le Bourg-d'Oisans	Alpe d'Huez	Richard Carapaz (ECU)

== The Giro d'Italia ==
The 2013 Giro d'Italia climbed the Col du Galibier, although the stage had to be shortened by 4 km due to heavy snowfall.

== See also ==
- List of highest paved roads in Europe
- List of mountain passes
- Dauphiné Alps
- Col du Chat
