= Pointe des Cerces =

Mountain in Savoie, France

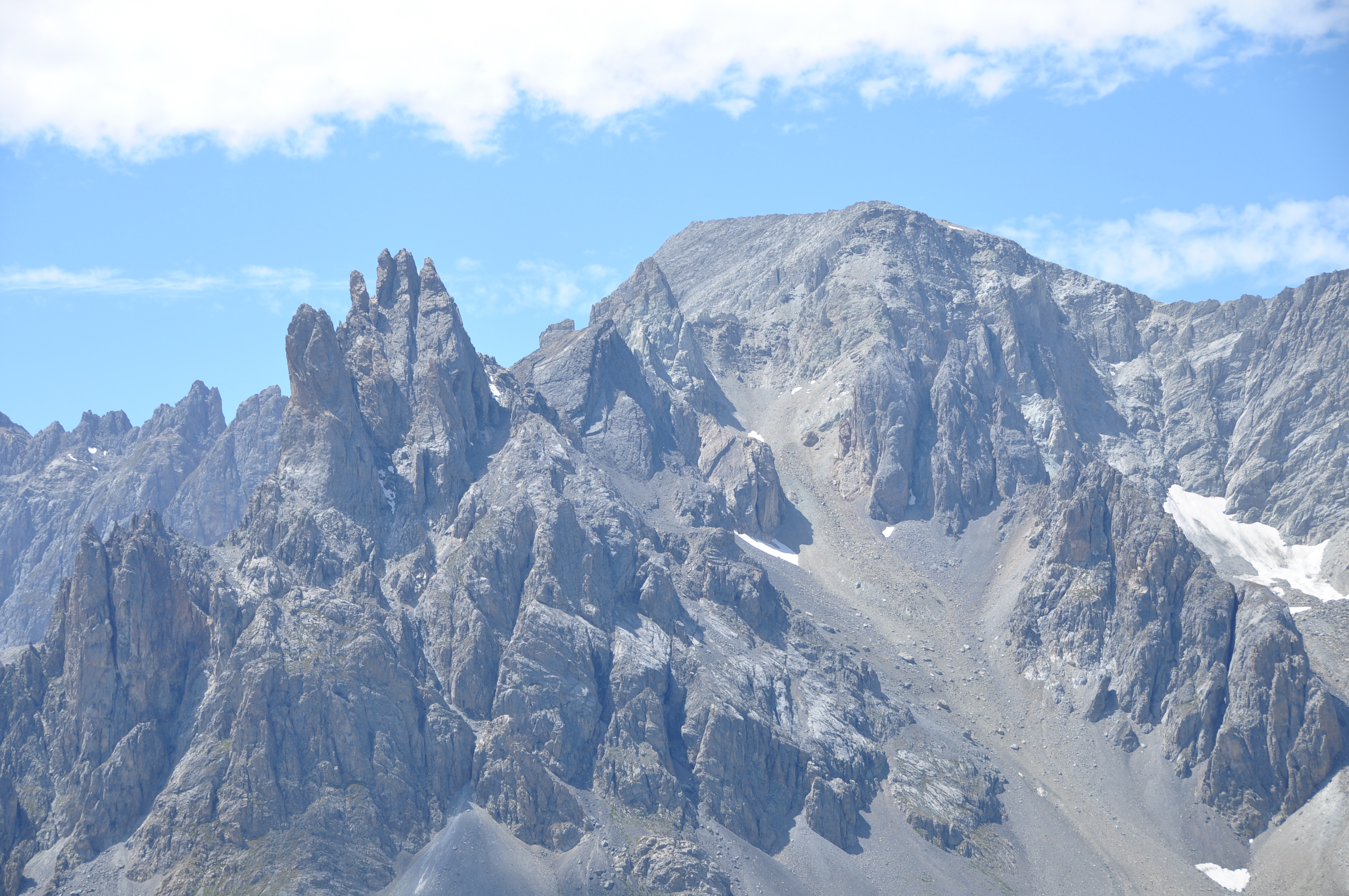

Highest point
- Elevation: 3,097 m (10,161 ft)
- Prominence: 485 m (1,591 ft)
- Isolation: 3.99 km (2.48 mi)
- Listing: Alpine mountains above 3000 m
- Coordinates: 45°03′57″N 06°29′15″E

Geography
- Location within France
- Location: Savoie, France
- Parent range: Massif des Cerces

Pointe des Cerces is a mountain of French Alpes. It lies at the border between Hautes-Alpes and Savoie, France. It lies in the Massif des Cerces range. It has an elevation of 3,097 metres above sea level.
