= Grand Galibier =

Mountain in Savoie, France

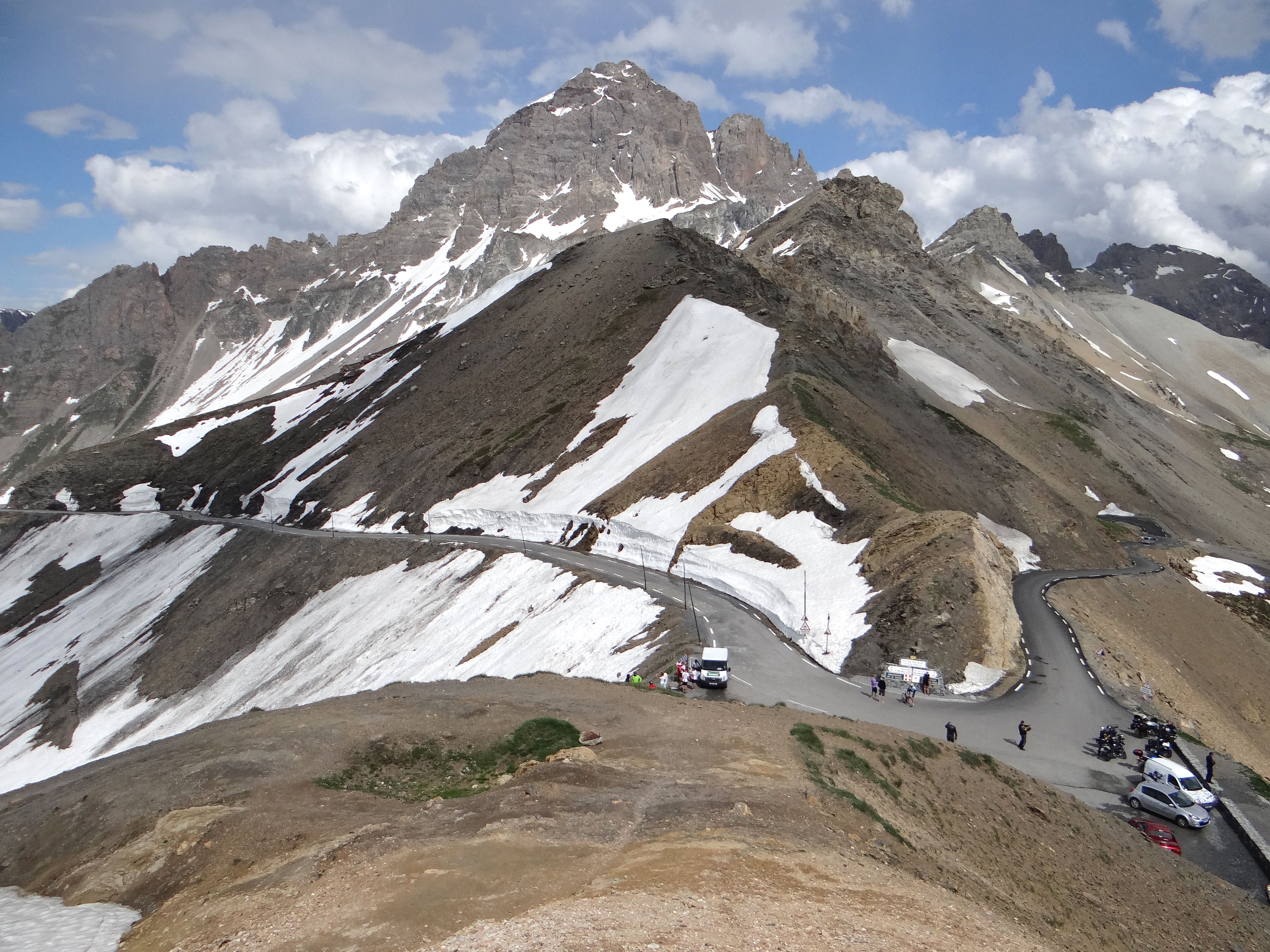
- Grand Galibier with the Col du Galibier in the foreground

Highest point
- Elevation: 3,228 m (10,591 ft)
- Prominence: 635 m (2,083 ft)
- Isolation: 9.2 km (5.7 mi)
- Listing: Alpine mountains above 3000 m
- Coordinates: 45°03′50″N 06°26′03″E

Geography
- Location within Alps
- Location: Savoie, France
- Parent range: Cottian Alps

Grand Galibier (3,228 m) is a mountain of the Cottian Alps in Savoie, France.

It is the highest mountain of the Massif des Cerces, a small chain of mountains located about 20 km northwest of Briançon, deep in the heart of the French Alps. It is most famous for giving its name to nearby Col du Galibier, a classic Tour de France climb, which lies on the mountain's shoulder, several hundred metres underneath its summit. The area around the mountain is also popular for hiking and mountain climbing.
