= Massif des Cerces =

Mountains in France

Coordinates: 45°6′N 6°32′E

Massif des Cerces (French pronunciation: [masif de sɛʁs]) is a region of the French Alps on the Franco-Italian border. On the French side it lies in the departments of Hautes-Alpes and Savoie.

The massif consists of smaller mountain chains including Mont Thabor as well as those of the Grand Galibier, Mont Chaberton and the Rois Mages. It is bordered by the massif de la Vanoise to the north, the massif du Mont-Cenis to the north-east, the Alpes Cottiennes to the east, the massif du Queyras and Écrins to the south and the massif d'Arvan-Villards to the west.

The northernmost end of the range is bordered by the Arc river to the north in the Maurienne valley, and the Guisane river to the south.

Ibexes populate the slopes of the massif. Wolves have also been spotted on the massif.

== Principal peaks ==
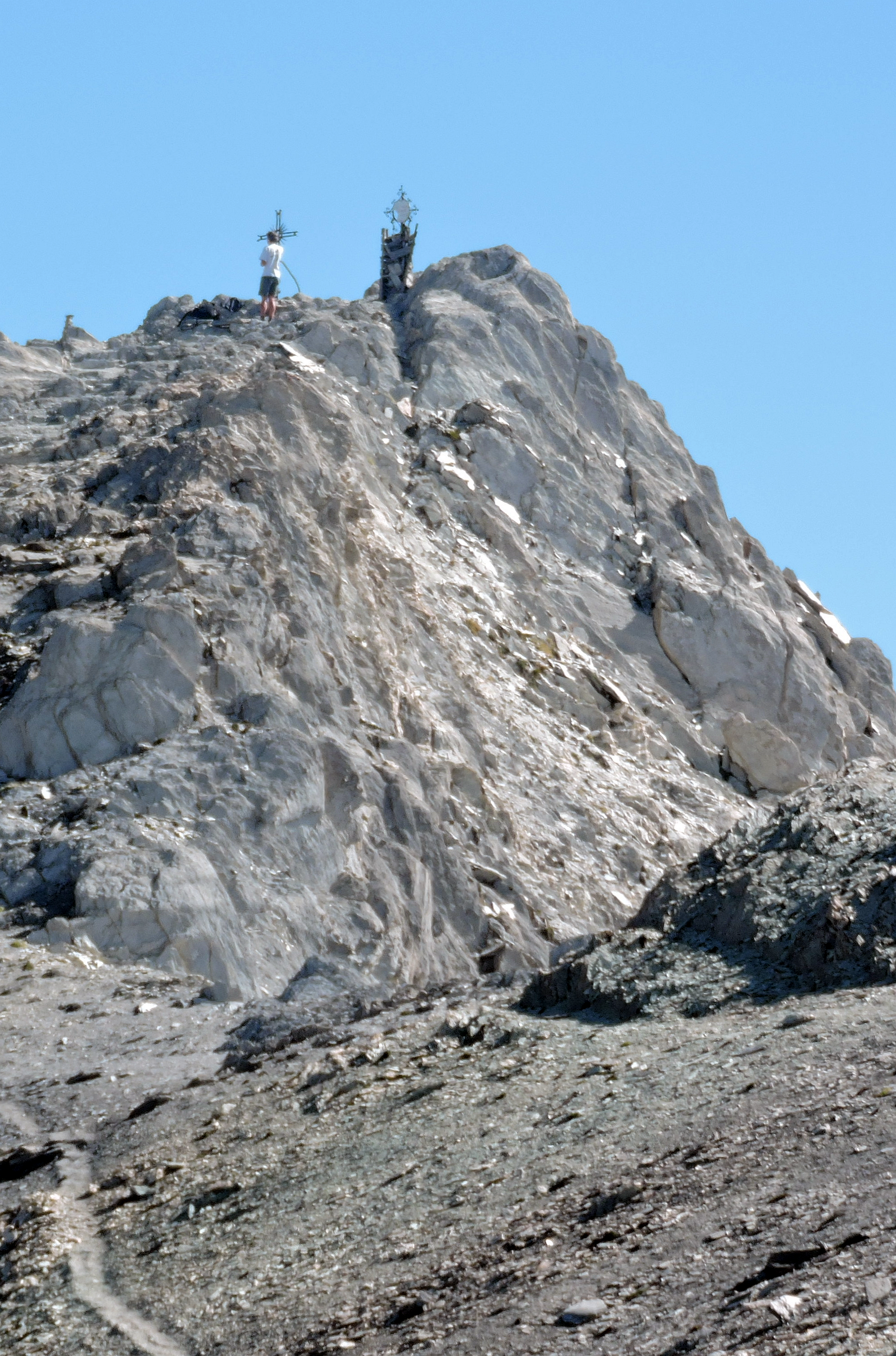
Pointe des Cerces

- Grand Galibier, 3,229 m (10,594 ft)
- Roche Bernaude, 3,225 m (10,581 ft)
- Pic du Thabor, 3,207 m (10,522 ft)
- Mont Thabor, 3,178 m (10,427 ft)
- Mont Chaberton, 3,136 m (10,289 ft)
- Pointe des Cerces, 3,097 m (10,161 ft)
- Roche Noire, 3,085 m (10,121 ft)
- Gran Bagna, 3,080 m (10,100 ft)
- Roc Termier, 3,078 m (10,098 ft)
- Pic de la Moulinière, 3,073 m (10,082 ft)
- Cime de la Planette, 3,071 m (10,075 ft)
- Pointe Rochers Charniers, 3,063 m (10,049 ft)
- Punta Nera, 3,047 m (9,997 ft)
- Rochers des Grands Becs, 3,044 m (9,987 ft)
- Le Grand Argentier, 3,042 m (9,980 ft)
- Roche Colombe, 3,023 m (9,918 ft)
- Grand Aréa, 2,869 m (9,413 ft)
- Mont Froid, 2,822 m (9,259 ft)
- Pointe de Bellecombe, 2,775 m (9,104 ft)

== Activities ==
=== Winter resorts ===
- Valloire
- Valmeinier
- Valfréjus

== See also ==
- Valfréjus avalanche, a multiple fatality avalanche in the Massif des Cerces in 2016
