= 3rd Alpini Regiment =

Active Italian Army mountain infantry unit

- 3° Reggimento Alpini
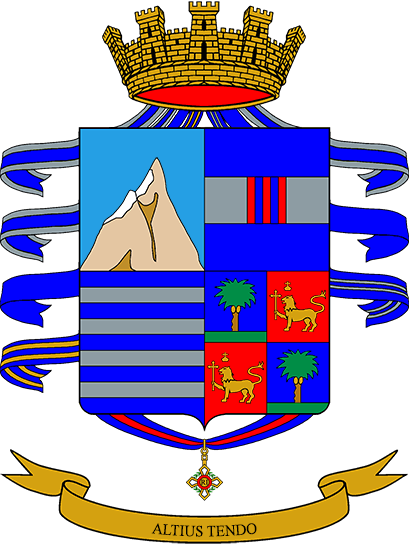
- Regimental coat of arms
- Active: 1 Nov. 1882 – Oct. 1943; 25 June 1944 – 30 Sept. 1944; 11 Oct. 1975 – today
- Country: Italy
- Branch: Italian Army
- Type: Mountain Infantry
- Part of: Alpine Brigade "Taurinense"
- Garrison/HQ: Pinerolo
- Motto: "Altius tendo"
- Anniversaries: 16 June 1916
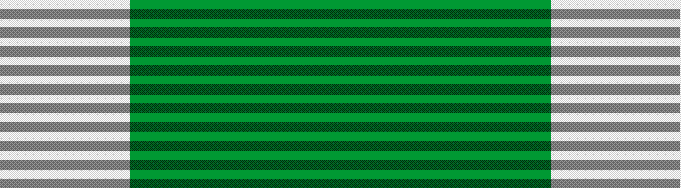
- Decorations: 1× Military Order of Italy; 3× Silver Medals of Military Valor; 2× Bronze Medals of Military Valor; 1× War Cross of Military Valor; 1× Bronze Medal of Army Valor; 1× Gold Cross of Army Merit; 1× Italian Red Cross Bronze Medal of Merit; 1× Silver Medal of Merit

Insignia
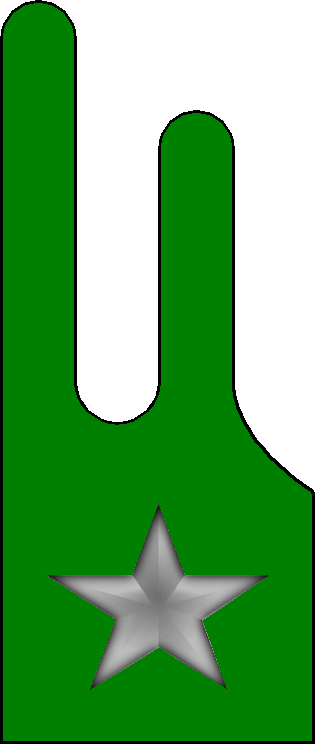
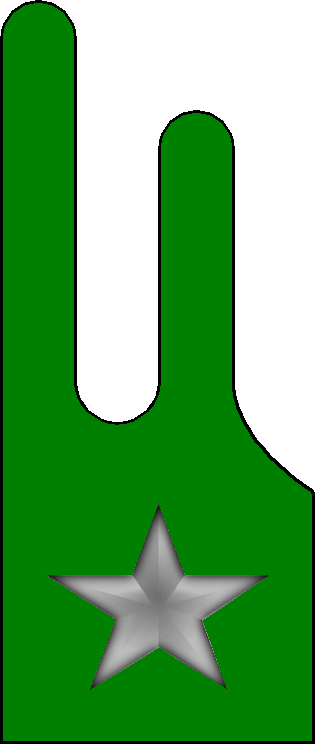
- Alpini gorget patches

The 3rd Alpini Regiment (Italian: 3° Reggimento Alpini) is a mountain warfare regiment of the Italian Army based in Pinerolo in Piedmont. The regiment belongs to the Italian Army's Alpini infantry speciality and is assigned to the Alpine Brigade "Taurinense". On 1 November 1882, the Royal Italian Army formed the 3rd Alpini Regiment, which had its recruiting area in the Cottian Alps and Graian Alps. During World War I the regiment expanded to 13 battalions, which fought separately in the alpine areas of the Italian front.

In 1935 the regiment was assigned to the 1st Alpine Division "Taurinense", with which it served during World War II in the invasion of France. In 1942 the division was transferred to Montenegro, where it served on occupation duty until the announcement of the Armistice of Cassibile on 8 September 1943. Following the announcement the division instantly began to fight German forces. By early October the remnants of the division and of its regiments were forced to surrender to the Germans. With Alpini, who had escaped from Montenegro the Italian Co-Belligerent Army formed in fall 1943, the Alpini Battalion "Piemonte", which fought on the allied side in the Italian campaign. From June to September 1944, the Alpini battalions "Piemonte" and "Monte Granero", which had been reformed by the depot of the 3rd Alpini Regiment in February 1943, were assigned to the reformed 3rd Alpini Regiment. On 30 September 1944, the 3rd Alpini Regiment was disbanded and the Alpini Battalion "Piemonte" was assigned to the Special Infantry Regiment "Legnano".

In 1946, the Alpini Battalion "Susa" was reformed and assigned to the 4th Alpini Regiment. In 1975 the 4th Alpini Regiment and the Alpini Battalion "Susa" became an autonomous unit. The battalion was assigned to the Alpine Brigade "Taurinense" and in 1976 it was assigned the flag and traditions of the 3rd Alpini Regiment. In 1993 the regiment was reformed. The regiment's anniversary falls on 16 June 1915, the day the regiment with the battalions "Pinerolo", "Fenestrelle", "Exilles", and "Susa" conquered the summit of Mount Krn in a night attack.

== History ==
On 15 October 1872, the Royal Italian Army formed 15 locally recruited Alpini companies in the alpine regions of Northern Italy. Nine more companies were formed the following year. In 1875 the 24 companies were organized into seven battalions, and in 1878 the companies were increased to 36 and the battalions to ten. On 1 November 1882, the Alpini companies were increased to 72 and grouped into 20 battalions. On the same date the battalions were assigned to six newly formed Alpini regiments, which were numbered 1st to 6th from West to East, while companies were numbered from 1 to 72 from to West to East. Upon entering the regiments, the battalions, which until then had been designated by a Roman numeral, were named for their recruiting zone, while the Alpini companies were renumbered sequentially from 1st to 72nd. One of the six Alpini regiments formed on 1 November 1882 was the 3rd Alpini Regiment, which was formed in Fossano in Southern Piedmont. The new regiment received the Battalion "Val Stura", which recruited in the Stura Valley, the Battalion "Val Maira", which recruited in the Maira Valley, and the Battalion "Monti Lessini", which recruited in Lessinia in Veneto.

- 3rd Alpini Regiment, in Fossano
  - Battalion "Val Stura", in Vinadio
    - 16th, 17th, 18th, and 19th Company
  - Battalion "Val Maira", in Dronero
    - 20th, 21st, 22nd, and 23rd Company
  - Battalion "Monti Lessini", in Verona
    - 56th, 57th, and 58th Company

In the night of 18–19 August 1883, the Battalion "Val Stura" helped extinguish a fire that threatened to engulf the village of Bersezio. For this the battalion was awarded a Bronze Medal of Civil Valor, which was affixed to the flag of the 3rd Alpini Regiment. In 1884 the regiment moved from Fossano to Savigliano. On 1 April 1885, the regiment transferred the battalions "Val Stura" and "Val Maira" to the 2nd Alpini Regiment, and the Battalion "Monti Lessini" to the 6th Alpini Regiment. In turn the regiment received from the 4th Alpini Regiment the Battalion "Val Chisone", which recruited in the Chisone Valley, and from the 5th Alpini Regiment the battalions "Val Dora" and "Moncenisio", which both recruited in the Susa Valley, through which the Dora Riparia river flows and which lies beneath the Moncenisio massif.

In 1886 the regiment moved from Savigliano to Turin and on 1 November of the same year, the battalions changed their names from their recruiting zones to the cities and towns, where their base was located. At the same time Alpini soldiers and non-commissioned officers were issued thread tufts, called Nappina in Italian, which were clipped to the Cappello Alpino headdress, and colored white for the troops of a regiment's first battalion, red for the troops of a regiment's second battalion, green for the troops of a regiment's third battalion, and blue for the troops of a regiment's fourth battalion. The 3rd Alpini Regiment consisted afterwards of the following units:

- 3rd Alpini Regiment, in Turin
  - Alpini Battalion "Fenestrelle", in Fenestrelle (former Battalion "Val Chisone")
    - 28th, 29th, 30th, and 37th Alpini Company
  - Alpini Battalion "Susa 1°", in Susa (former Battalion "Val Dora")
    - 31st, 32nd, and 33rd Alpini Company
  - Alpini Battalion "Susa 2°", in Susa (former Battalion "Moncenisio")
    - 34th, 35th, and 36th Alpini Company

On 1 October 1888, the Alpini Battalion "Susa 2°" was transferred to the 4th Alpini Regiment, which in turn ceded its Alpini Battalion "Pinerolo" in Pinerolo to the 3rd Alpini Regiment. During the same year the regiment also ceded the 37th Company of the Battalion "Fenestrelle" to the Alpini Battalion "Ivrea" of the 4th Alpini Regiment. On 1 February 1889, the Alpini Battalion "Susa 1°" moved from Susa to Exilles and consequently the battalion was renamed Alpini Battalion "Exilles", while on the same date the Alpini Battalion "Susa 2°" was renamed Alpini Battalion "Susa". In 1895–96 the regiment provided 16 officers and 574 troops to help form the II provisional Alpini battalions, which was deployed to Eritrea for the First Italo-Ethiopian War. In 1901 the regiment was assigned together with the 4th Alpini Regiment and 5th Alpini Regiment to the II Alpini Group, which on 9 August 1910 was renamed II Alpine Brigade. In 1908 the Alpini Battalion "Susa" returned to the 3rd Alpini Regiment and the Alpini Battalion "Pinerolo" ceded its 24th Alpini Company to the 4th Alpini Regiment, to help form the Alpini Battalion "Pallanza". After the 3rd Alpini Regiment which consisted of the following battalions:

- 3rd Alpini Regiment, in Turin
  - Alpini Battalion "Pinerolo", in Pinerolo
    - 25th, 26th, and 27th Alpini Company
  - Alpini Battalion "Fenestrelle", in Fenestrelle
    - 28th, 29th, and 30th Alpini Company
  - Alpini Battalion "Exilles", in Exilles
    - 31st, 32nd, and 33rd Alpini Company
  - Alpini Battalion "Susa", in Susa
    - 34th, 35th, and 36th Alpini Company

In December 1908 the regiment was deployed to the area of the Strait of Messina for the recovery efforts after the 1908 Messina earthquake. For its service the regiment was awarded a Silver Medal of Merit, which was affixed to the regiment's flag.

=== Italo-Turkish War ===
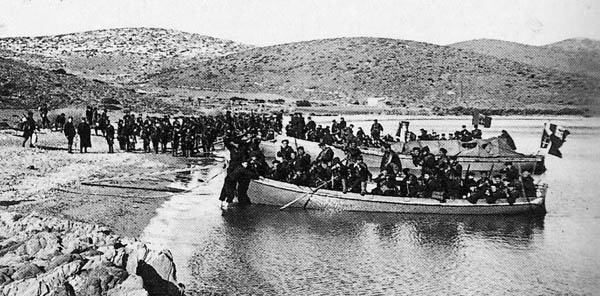
Italian troops landing on Rhodes in May 1912

On 29 September 1911, the Kingdom of Italy declared war against the Ottoman Empire and the Alpini battalions "Fenestrelle" and "Susa" were deployed to Libya for the Italo-Turkish War. On 4 May 1912, the Alpini Battalion "Fenestrelle" was part of the Italian forces, which landed in Kalithea Bay on Rhodes in the Aegean Sea. The battalion participated in the Battle of Rhodes, which led to the Italian occupation of the Dodecanese islands in the Aegean Sea. On 6 August 1912, the Alpini Battalion "Susa" participated in the occupation of Zuwarah in Libya and in October 1912 the battalion was assigned to the 8th Special Regiment, which had been formed in Libya with the command of the 8th Alpini Regiment and was led by Colonel Antonio Cantore. On 23 March 1913, the 8th Special Regiment fought in the Battle of Assaba against local rebel forces.

=== World War I ===
At the outbreak of World War I the Alpini speciality consisted of eight regiments, which fielded 26 battalions with 79 companies. Each Alpini battalion, with the exception of the Alpini Battalion "Verona", fielded three Alpini companies, while the Alpini Battalion "Verona" fielded four companies. Each company consisted of one captain, four lieutenants and 250 other ranks. After Italy's initial declaration of neutrality 38 additional Alpini companies were formed during the autumn of 1914 with men, who had completed their military service in the preceding four years. These companies were numbered from 80th to 117th and assigned to the existing Alpini battalions. In January 1915, each Alpini battalion formed a reserve battalion, with men, who had completed their military service at least four years, but not more than eleven years prior. These reserve battalions were named for a valley (Italian: Valle; abbreviated Val) located near their associated regular Alpini battalion's base, and the reserve battalions received the same Nappina as their associated regular Alpini battalion. The companies of the Valle battalions were numbered from 201st to 281st, with the numbers 227th, 233rd, 237th, 271st, and 273rd unused.

On 23 May 1915, Italy declared war on Austria-Hungary and at the time the 3rd Alpini Regiment consisted of the following units:

- 3rd Alpini Regiment, in Turin
  - Alpini Battalion "Pinerolo"
    - 25th, 26th, 27th, and 82nd Alpini Company
  - Alpini Battalion "Fenestrelle"
    - 28th, 29th, 30th, and 83rd Alpini Company
  - Alpini Battalion "Exilles"
    - 31st, 32nd, 33rd, and 84th Alpini Company
  - Alpini Battalion "Susa"
    - 34th, 35th, 36th, 85th, and 102nd Alpini Company
  - Alpini Battalion "Val Pellice"
    - 224th, 225th, and 226th Alpini Company
  - Alpini Battalion "Val Chisone"
    - 228th, 229th, and 230th Alpini Company
  - Alpini Battalion "Val Dora"
    - 231st and 232nd Alpini Company (3rd Alpini Company, originally assigned to the Alpini Battalion "Pieve di Teco", joined the battalion in 1916)
  - Alpini Battalion "Val Cenischia"
    - 234th, 235th, and 236th Alpini Company

By the end of 1915 the Alpini regiments began to form additional companies with recruits born in 1896. These new companies were numbered from 118th to 157th and were used, together with the 38 companies formed earlier, to form an additional reserve battalion for each regular battalion. These new battalions were named for a mountain (Italian: Monte) located near their associated regular Alpini battalion's base, and the reserve battalions received the same Nappina as their associated regular Alpini battalion. The 3rd Alpini Regiment thus added the following Monte battalions:

- Alpini Battalion "Monte Granero"
  - 82nd, 125th, and 126th Alpini Company
- Alpini Battalion "Monte Albergian"
  - 83rd, 127th, and 128th Alpini Company
- Alpini Battalion "Monte Assietta"
  - 84th, 129th, and 130th Alpini Company
- Alpini Battalion "Moncenisio"
  - 85th, 102nd, and 131st Alpini Company

As the mountainous terrain of the Italian front made the deployment of entire Alpini regiments impracticable, the regimental commands of the eight Alpini regiments were disbanded in March 1916. Likewise in April 1916 the pre-war alpine brigade commands were disbanded, and the personnel of the regimental commands and alpine brigade commands used to from twenty regiment-sized group commands and nine brigade-sized grouping commands. Afterwards Alpini battalions were employed either independently or assigned to groups, groupings, or infantry divisions as needed. On 15 June 1916, the regiment formed the 158th Alpini Company, which was assigned to the Alpini Battalion "Fenestrelle". On 16 May 1916, the Alpini Battalion "Pieve di Teco" of the 1st Alpini Regiment was disbanded and the battalion's 3rd Alpini Company was reformed by the 3rd Alpini Regiment to complement Alpini Battalion "Val Dora".

In February and March 1917 the Royal Italian Army formed twelve skiers battalions, each with two skiers companies. On 6 July 1917, the VII Skiers Battalion was disbanded and its personnel used to form the Alpini Battalion "Courmayeur", which was assigned to the 3rd Alpini Regiment and consisted of the 303rd, 304th, and 305th Alpini companies. The battalion was associated with the Alpini Battalion "Pinerolo" and therefore its troops wore a white Nappina.

In November and December 1917, after the disastrous Battle of Caporetto, the following retreat to the Piave river, and the subsequent First Battle of the Piave River and First Battle of Monte Grappa, the Royal Italian Army disbanded twenty Alpini battalions, which had suffered heavy casualties during the battles and retreat. Among the twenty battalions were the following battalions of the 3rd Alpini Regiment:

- Alpini Battalion "Monte Assietta"; battalion annihilated during the retreat and disbanded on 18 November 1917
- Alpini Battalion "Val Chisone"; battalion annihilated during the retreat and disbanded on 22 November 1917, with the survivors assigned to the 2nd Alpini Regiment's Alpini Battalion "Borgo San Dalmazzo"
- Alpini Battalion "Monte Albergian"; battalion annihilated during the Battle of Caporetto and disbanded on 25 November 1917
- Alpini Battalion "Val Dora"; battalion annihilated during the First Battle of Monte Grappa and disbanded on 9 December 1917

After the retreat to the Piave river the Alpini battalions "Val Pellice" and "Courmayeur" fought in December 1917 for control of Monte Asolone in the Monte Grappa massif, where the two battalions suffered again heavy casualties. On 15 February 1918, the battalion "Val Pellice" and "Courmayeur" were two of further seven Alpini battalions to be disbanded. The remaining personnel of the "Courmayeur" was transferred to the Alpini Battalion "Moncenisio".

During the war a total of 2,375 officers and 32,300 soldiers served in the 3rd Alpini Regiment, of which 138 officers and 5,697 soldiers were killed in action, while 535 officers and 11,030 soldiers were wounded. For their service and sacrifice during the war four of the regiment's battalions were awarded a Silver Medal of Military Valor:

- the Alpini battalions "Exilles" and "Susa" were awarded a shared Silver Medal of Military Valor for having conquered the summit of Krn in a night attack on 15–16 June 1915.
- the Alpini Battalion "Pinerolo" was awarded a Silver Medal of Military Valor for its conduct on Mrzli Vrh on 2 June 1915, and for the battalion's delaying actions to slow the Austro-Hungarian advance during the Battle of Caporetto in October and November 1917.
- the Alpini Battalion "Val Albergian" was awarded a Silver Medal of Military Valor for its sacrifice during the Battle of Caporetto on 24–25 October 1917, when the battalion held it positions for two days even though it was surrounded and all routes of escape cut.

The three Silver Medals of Military Valor were affixed to the 3rd Alpini Regiment's flag and added to the regiment's coat of arms.

=== Interwar years ===
After the end of the war the Alpini battalions "Monte Granero", "Moncenisio", and "Val Cenischia" were disbanded, while the Alpini Battalion "Fenestrelle" was sent to the Italian Protectorate of Albania to fight in the Vlora War. On 1 January 1920, the regimental command was reformed and the reformed regiment transferred its Alpini Battalion "Pinerolo" to the 1st Alpini Regiment. With the transfer of the battalion also the military awards of the battalion were transferred from the 3rd Alpini Regiment to the 1st Alpini Regiment and affixed to the flag of the latter. In 1921, the regiment was assigned to the 1st Alpine Division, which also included the 1st Alpini Regiment, 2nd Alpini Regiment, and 1st Mountain Artillery Regiment. On 3 January 1923, the Alpini Battalion "Pinerolo" returned to the regiment. During the same year the 1st Alpine Division was replaced by the I Alpini Grouping, which in 1926 was reorganized as I Alpine Brigade. The brigade included, besides the 3rd Alpini Regiment, also the 1st Alpini Regiment, 2nd Alpini Regiment, 4th Alpini Regiment, and 1st Mountain Artillery Regiment.

On 19 October 1933, I Alpine Brigade was split and the 1st Alpini Regiment and 2nd Alpini Regiment were assigned to the newly formed IV Alpine Brigade, while the 3rd Alpini Regiment, 4th Alpini Regiment, and 1st Mountain Artillery Regiment remained with the I Alpine Brigade. On 27 October 1934, the I Alpine Brigade was renamed I Superior Alpine Command. In December of the same year the command was given the name "Taurinense". On 31 October 1935, the I Superior Alpine Command "Taurinense" was reorganized as 1st Alpine Division "Taurinense", which included the 3rd Alpini Regiment, 4th Alpini Regiment, and 1st Alpine Artillery Regiment "Taurinense".

=== Second Italo-Ethiopian War ===
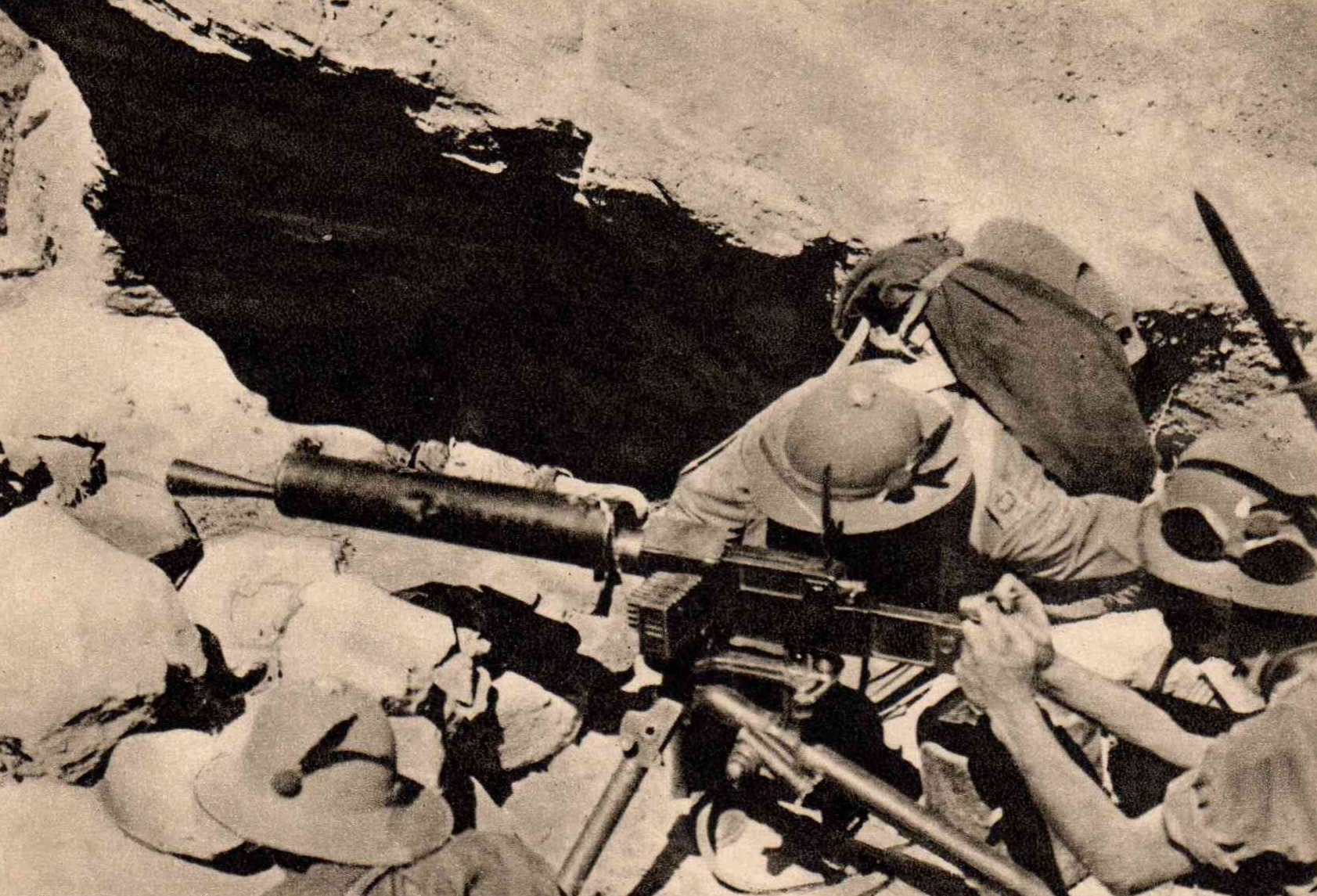
Alpini with a Fiat–Revelli Mod. 1914 machine gun during the Battle of Amba Aradam

In fall of 1935, the 3rd Alpini Regiment provided 852 men of all ranks to help form the command company of the 11th Alpini Regiment and the command and logistical services of the 5th Alpine Division "Pusteria", which were both formed in preparation for the Second Italo-Ethiopian War. On 26 December 1935, the 3rd Alpini Regiment transferred its Alpini Battalion "Exilles" to the 7th Alpini Regiment, which on 31 December of the same year was assigned to the 5th Alpine Division "Pusteria". On 6 January 1936 the "Pusteria" division's units embarked in Livorno and Naples for the transfer to Massawa in Eritrea. The same month the 3rd Alpini Regiment formed the 614th Company, which consisted of volunteers and was assigned to the VII Replacements Battalion. The VII Replacements Battalion was attached to 7th Alpini Regiment and shipped to East Africa, where in the meantime the "Pusteria" was engaged in combat against Ethiopian troops. On 20 April 1937, the Alpini Battalion "Exilles" returned to Italy and the regiment.

=== World War II ===
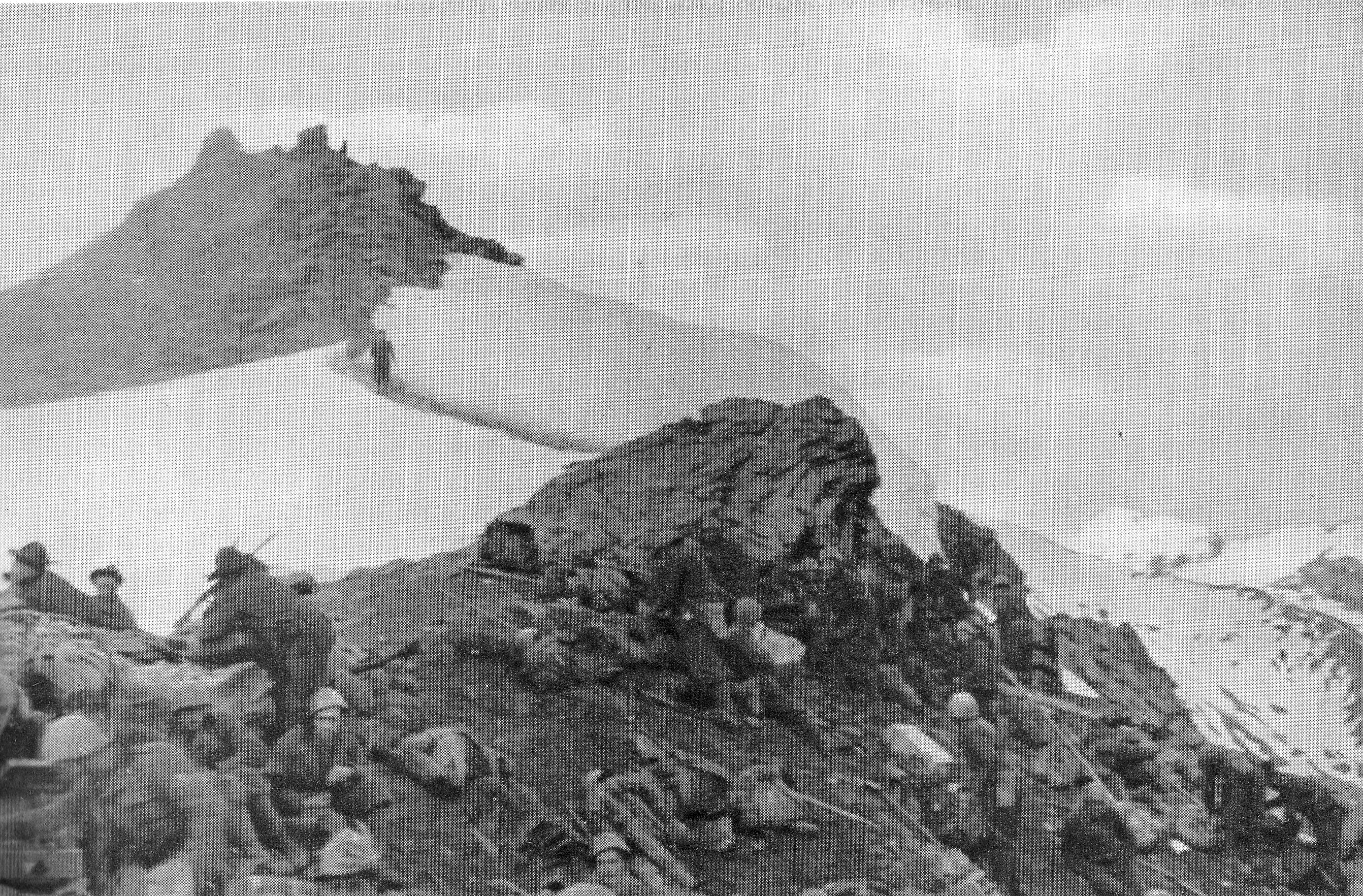
Alpini Battalion "Val Dora" troops attacking French positions on the Col de Pelouse on 21–24 June 1940

On 25 August 1939, shortly before the German Invasion of Poland, the Alpini battalions "Val Pellice", "Val Chisone", "Val Dora", and "Val Cenischia" were reformed with reservists. The regiment's fourth battalion, the Alpini Battalion "Susa", operated as autonomous unit throughout the war. On 10 June 1940, the day Italy entered World War II, the regiment fielded 160 officers and 5,046 other ranks for a total strength of 5,206 men. The regiment had 23 horses, 1,242 mules and 109 transport vehicles at its disposal. The regiment's organization at the time was as follows:

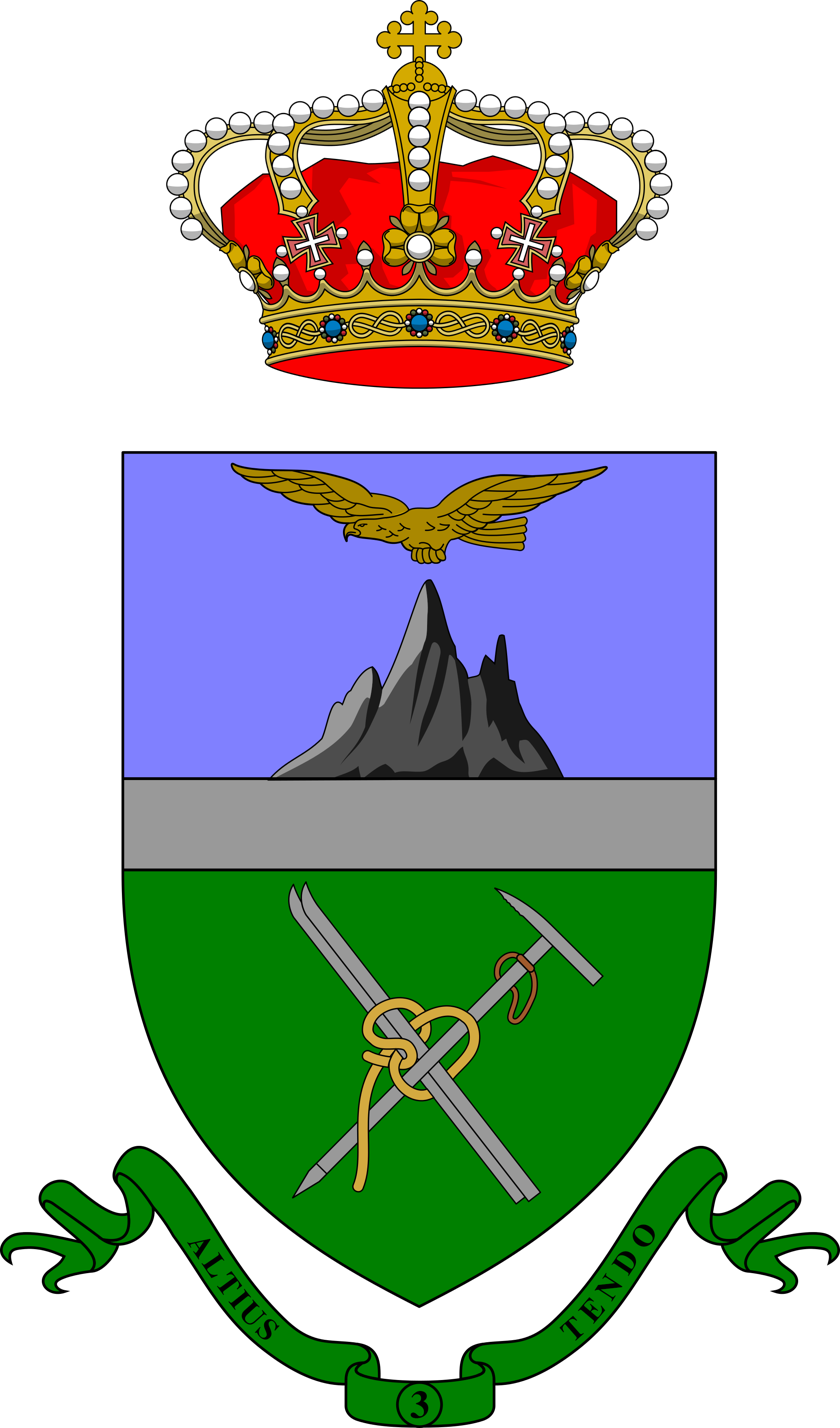
- 3rd Alpini Regiment, in Turin
  - Regimental Command Company
  - Alpini Battalion "Pinerolo”
    - Command Company
    - 25th, 26th, and 27th Alpini Company
  - Alpini Battalion "Fenestrelle"
    - Command Company
    - 28th, 29th, and 30th Alpini Company
  - Alpini Battalion "Exilles"
    - Command Company
    - 31st, 32nd, and 33rd Alpini Company
  - 3rd Supply Section
  - 3rd Medical Section (includes a Field Hospital)
  - 23rd Train Section (equipped with mules)

In June 1940 the regiment participated in the invasion of France. During the invasion the regiment's Alpini Battalion "Susa" was attached to the 59th Infantry Division "Cagliari". As part of the invasion the Alpini Battalion "Val Dora" attacked French positions on the Col de Pelouse on 21–24 June 1940. For its conduct during the invasion the Alpini Battalion "Val Dora" was awarded a War Cross of Military Valor, which was affixed to the flag of the 3rd Alpini Regiment. After the invasion the "Taurinense" division deployed to Southern France on occupation duty. On 31 October 1940, the Alpini battalions "Val Pellice", "Val Chisone", "Val Dora", and "Val Cenischia" were disbanded.

==== Balkans Campaign ====
On 10 January 1941, the Alpini battalions "Val Pellice" and "Val Cenischia" were reformed for a second time, and sent to Albania, where the two battalion were assigned to the 3rd Alpini Group, which was fighting in the Greco-Italian War. In February 1941, the Alpini Battalion "Susa" was also sent to Albania, where the battalion reinforced the 3rd Alpine Division "Julia", which was being reformed after having suffered massive losses in the Greek counteroffensives of December and January. The "Julia" division returned to the front on 25 February 1941 and fought until the end of the war in April 1941. Following the German invasion and Axis occupation of Greece, the "Julia" division was transferred to the Corinth Canal area and occupied the Peloponnese. For its conduct on the Greek Front the Alpini Battalion "Susa" was awarded a Bronze Medal of Military Valor, which was affixed to the flag of the 3rd Alpini Regiment and added to the regiment's coat of arms.

In the course of 1941, the Alpini Battalion "Val Chisone" was reformed and assigned to the 4th Alpini Group, which served on occupation duty in Yugoslavia. In January 1942 the "Taurinense" division landed in Dubrovnik and from where it moved to Mostar in Croatia. From 15 April to 31 May 1942 the division participated in the third Axis anti-Partisan offensive. The division captured Trnovo and advanced to Kalinovik, where it made contact with elements of the 22nd Infantry Division "Cacciatori delle Alpi"; but, overall, the offensive was a failure. In August 1942 the Taurinense moved to Nikšić in Montenegro.

During 1942, the Alpini Battalion "Susa" was assigned to the 4th Alpine Valley Group of the 6th Alpine Division "Alpi Graie". In February 1943, the regiment's depots in Italy reformed two Monte battalions: the Alpini Battalion "Monte Albergian" and the Alpini Battalion "Monte Granero". Both battalions were assigned to the 175th Coastal Alpini Regiment, which was sent in April 1943 to the occupied French island of Corsica. The same month the regiment formed the XXXI and XXXII replacement battalions, with personnel meant to replace losses suffered by the regiment's regular battalions. However both battalions were deployed to the Isonzo valley to fight Yugoslav partisans. Upon reaching their destination the two battalions were renamed Alpini Battalion "Monte Assietta" respectively Alpini Battalion "Rocciamelone". During 1943, the regiment also reformed the Alpini Battalion "Val Dora", which was assigned to the 3rd Alpine Valley Group of the 6th Alpine Division "Alpi Graie", and the Alpini Battalion "Val Cenischia", which was assigned to the XX Skiers Grouping and renamed Skiers Battalion "Moncenisio" on 15 June 1943.

In May and June 1943 the "Taurinense" division took part in the fifth Axis anti-Partisan offensive. After the announcement of the Armistice of Cassibile on 8 September 1943 most of the division "Taurinense" immediately attacked German positions and by sunrise of 9 September the division was fully engaged in combat with German forces. The division tried to reach Kotor to be evacuated by sea to Apulia in Southern Italy, but in heavy combat the division lost about half its strength of 14,000 men. By early October 1943, the remnants of the division and its regiments were forced to surrender to the Germans. Only about 150 men of the Alpini Battalion "Fenestrelle" and a handful of men of other "Taurinense" units managed to commandeer ships and boats and escape to Apulia.

At the same time the 175th Coastal Alpini Regiment, which included the 3rd Alpini Regiment's Alpini battalions "Monte Albergian" and "Monte Granero" fought against German forces retreating through Corsica. In November 1943, the 175th Coastal Alpini Regiment was transferred to Sardinia, where the battalion "Monte Albergian" was disbanded on 31 August 1944.

==== Italian Campaign ====
When the Armistice of Cassibile was announced 287 Alpini were waiting in Bari in Apulia to be shipped to Montenegro as replacements for the "Taurinense" division. On 28 October 1943, these Alpini and the men of the Alpini Battalion "Fenestrelle", who had managed to escape from Montenegro, were grouped together by the Italian Co-Belligerent Army in an Alpini Reconnaissance Unit. On 4 December 1943, this unit was reorganized as Alpini Battalion "Taurinense". On 1 January 1944, the battalion was renamed Alpini Battalion "Piemonte". On 19 March 1944, the battalion entered the Italian Liberation Corps, which fought on the allied side in the Italian campaign. In June 1944 the Alpini Battalion "Monte Granero" was transferred from Sardinia to Southern Italy, where on 25 June 1944, the Alpini battalions "Piemonte" and "Monte Granero" entered the reformed 3rd Alpini Regiment. The regiment was assigned, together with the 4th Bersaglieri Regiment, to the I Brigade of the Italian Liberation Corps.

On 24 September 1944, the Italian Liberation Corps and 4th Bersaglieri Regiment were disbanded, while on 30 September 1944, the 3rd Alpini Regiment was reorganized as Special Infantry Regiment "Legnano". At the same time the Alpini Battalion "Monte Granero" was disbanded and its personnel integrated into the Alpini Battalion "Piemonte". On 1 October 1944, the Special Infantry Regiment "Legnano" received the Alpini Battalion "Abruzzi", and then consisted of the Bersaglieri Battalion "Goito" and the Alpini battalions "Piemonte" and "Abruzzi". The regiment then joined to the Combat Group "Legnano", which was equipped with British materiel and assigned to the Polish II Corps of the British 8th Army. On 25 November 1944, the Alpini Battalion "Abruzzi" was renamed Alpini Battalion "L'Aquila". The Combat Group "Legnano"fought on the allied side in the Italian campaign until the German surrender. For its conduct in September 1943 in Corsica, and its service with the Italian Liberation Corps in the Italian Campaign the Alpini Battalion "Monte Granero" was awarded a Bronze Medal of Military Valor, which was affixed to the 3rd Alpini Regiment's flag and added to the regiment's coat of arms.

=== Cold War ===
On 23 November 1945, an Alpini regiment was formed in Turin, which was initially designated 1st Alpini Regiment as it was formed within the area overseen by the I Territorial Military Command. The regiment consisted of the I, II, and III Alpini battalions, which had been formed by renaming the 530th, 526th, and 515th guard battalions of the Italian Co-belligerent Army. On 1 January 1946, the I Alpini Battalion was renamed Alpini Battalion "Saluzzo", while the II Alpini Battalion was renamed Alpini Battalion "Susa". On 1 February 1946, the Alpini Battalion "Saluzzo" was transferred to the Special Infantry Regiment "Legnano", which in turn ceded the Alpini Battalion "Piemonte" to the 1st Alpini Regiment. On the same date, 1 February 1946, the Alpini Battalion "Piemonte" was renamed Alpini Battalion "Aosta", while the regiment's III Alpini Battalion was renamed Alpini Battalion "Saluzzo". On 15 April 1946, the regiment was renumbered as 4th Alpini Regiment.

On 15 April 1952, the 4th Alpini Regiment joined the newly formed Alpine Brigade "Taurinense". On 1 January 1953, the regiment began the process of reforming the Alpini Battalion "Mondovì". The 4th Alpini Regiment now consisted of the Alpini Battalion "Mondovì", which was one of the traditional battalions of the 1st Alpini Regiment, the Alpini Battalion "Aosta", which was one of the traditional battalions of the 4th Alpini Regiment, the Alpini Battalion "Saluzzo", which was one of the traditional battalions of the 2nd Alpini Regiment, the Alpini Battalion "Susa", which was one of the traditional battalions of the 3rd Alpini Regiment, and the 4th Mortar Company.

On 1 November 1962, the Alpini Battalion "Mondovì" was transferred to the 8th Alpini Regiment of the Alpine Brigade "Julia". In May 1963, the Alpini Battalion "Aosta" was assigned to the Alpine Military School in Aosta. The same year, the Alpini Battalion "Susa" was designated as the Italian Army's contribution to NATO's air-transportable Allied Command Europe Mobile Force (Land). On 31 December 1964, the 4th Mortar Company was split to form a mortar company for each of the regiment's three battalions. Afterwards the Alpini Battalion "Susa" consisted of the following units:

- Alpini Battalion "Susa", in Pinerolo
  - Command and Services Company
  - 34th, 35th, and 36th Alpini Company
  - 133rd Mortar Company

During the 1975 army reform the army disbanded the regimental level and newly independent battalions were granted for the first time their own flags. On 10 October 1975, the 4th Alpini Regiment was disbanded and the next day the regiment's three battalions became autonomous units. The Alpini battalions "Saluzzo" and "Susa" were assigned to the Alpine Brigade "Taurinense", while the Alpini Battalion "Aosta" was assigned to the Alpine Military School. The three Alpini battalions consisted now of a command, a command and services company, three Alpini companies, and a heavy mortar company with eight 120mm Mod. 63 mortars. Each of the three Alpini battalions fielded now 950 men (45 officers, 96 non-commissioned officers, and 809 soldiers).

On 12 November 1976 the President of the Italian Republic Giovanni Leone assigned with decree 846 the flag and traditions of the 3rd Alpini Regiment to the Alpini Battalion "Susa".

=== Recent times ===
From April to July 1991, the Alpini Battalion "Susa" deployed to northern Iraq for the American-led Operation Provide Comfort. In 1992, the "Taurinense" brigade's Anti-Tank Company was disbanded and its personnel, with their TOW anti-tank guided missiles, assigned to the mortar companies of the 2nd Alpini Regiment and of the Alpini Battalion "Susa". Consequently, the "Susa" battalion's 133rd Mortar Company was renamed 133rd Support Weapons Company. Between 2 March and 22 October 1993 the Alpini Battalion "Susa" served with the United Nations Operation in Mozambique. For its service in Mozambique the "Susa" battalion was awarded a Gold Cross of Army Merit, which was affixed to the regiment's flag. On 22 October 1993, the Alpini Battalion "Susa" lost its autonomy and the next day the battalion entered the reformed 3rd Alpini Regiment. In November 1994 the regiment was sent to the Province of Asti, which had been inundated by severe floods. For its work in Asti the Italian Red Cross awarded the 3rd Alpini Regiment a Bronze Medal of Merit, which was affixed to the regiment's flag.

Between 3 February and 28 June 1997, and between 18 August and 14 October 1998 the 3rd Alpini Battalion Regiment was part of NATO's Stabilisation Force in Bosnia and Herzegovina. For its service in Bosnia and Herzegovina the 3rd Alpini Regiment was awarded a Bronze Medal of Army Valor, which was affixed to the regiment's flag and added to the regiment's coat of arms.

In 1999, the regiment deployed to Kosovo with NATO's Operation Joint Guardian. In 2001 the 133rd Support Weapons Company was split into the 133rd Mortar Company and the 221st Anti-tank Company "Val Varaita". From 3 September 2002 to 18 January 2003, the regiment deployed with NATO's International Security Assistance Force for the first time to Afghanistan. In total the regiment deployed six times to Afghanistan between 2002 and 2013. On 20 October 2002, the Allied Command Europe Mobile Force (Land) was disbanded. In 2011, the 221st Anti-tank Company "Val Varaita" was disbanded and its personnel integrated into the 133rd Mortar Company, which was renamed 133rd Maneuver Support Company. From August 2017 to February 2018, the regiment deployed to Iraq.

== Organization ==
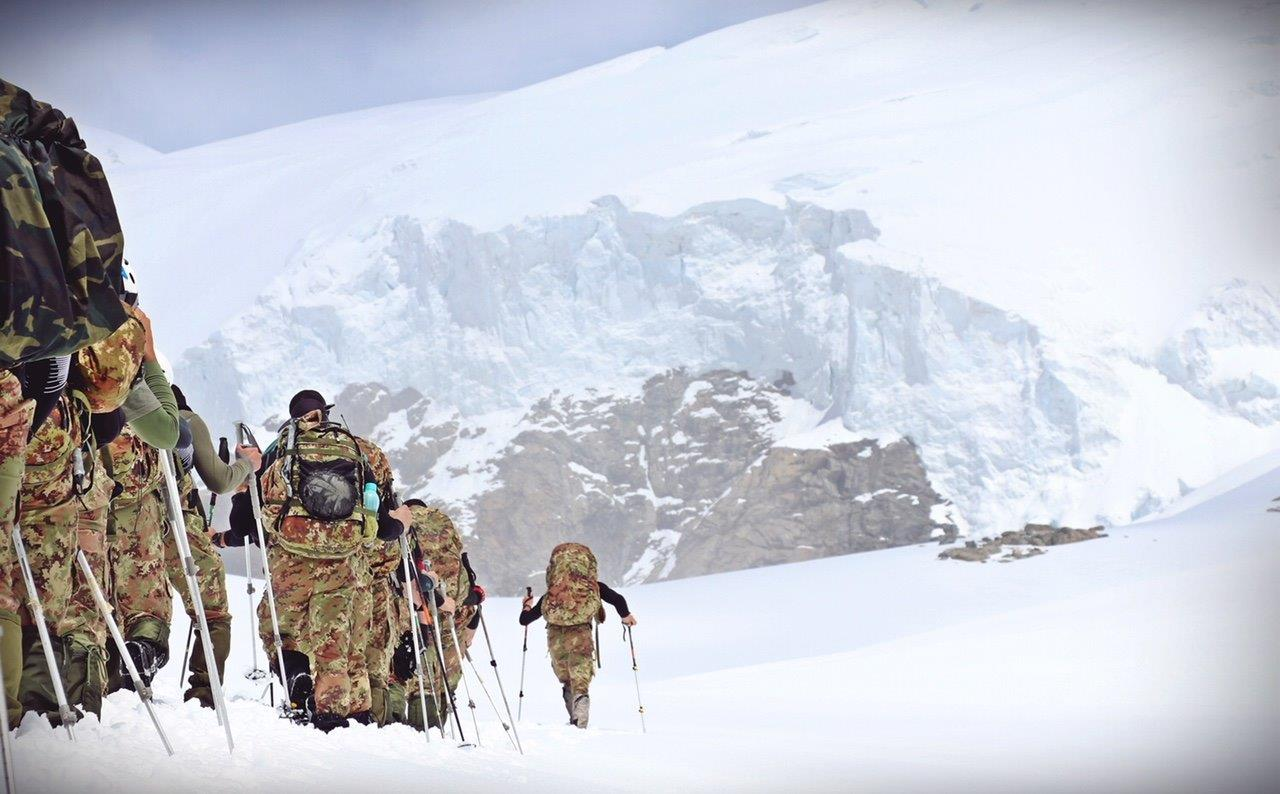
3rd Alpini Regiment troops on the Monte Rosa glacier

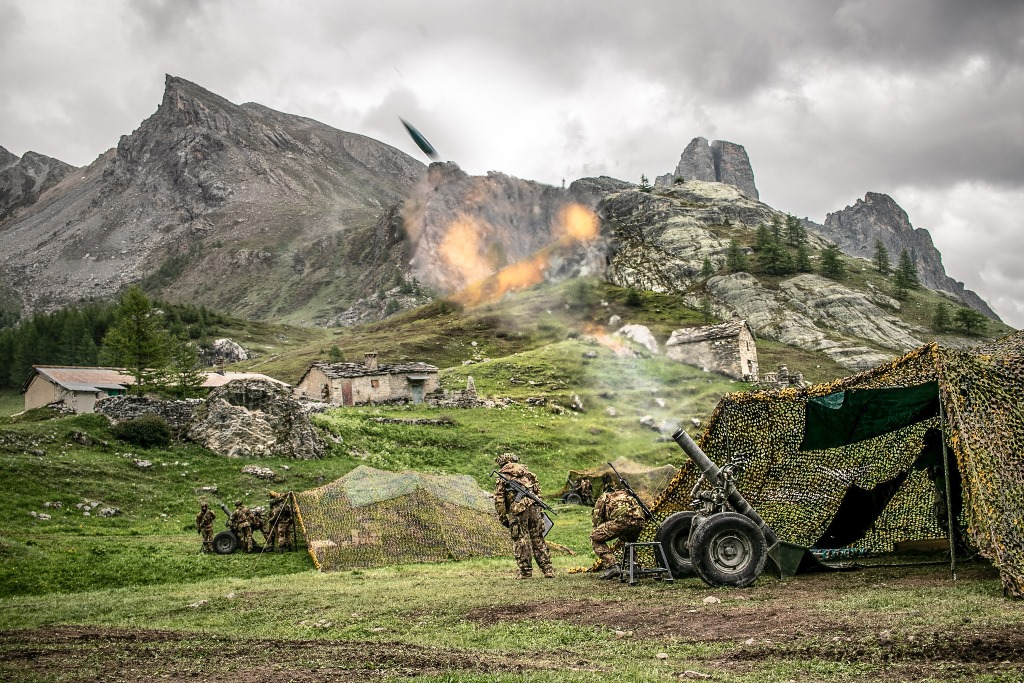
3rd Alpini Regiment mortar platoon

As of 2024 the 3rd Alpini Regiment is organized as follows:

- 3rd Alpini Regiment, in Pinerolo
  - Command and Logistic Support Company
  - Alpini Battalion "Susa"
    - 34th Alpini Company
    - 35th Alpini Company
    - 36th Alpini Company
    - 133rd Maneuver Support Company

The Alpini companies are equipped with Bv 206S tracked all-terrain carriers and Lince light multirole vehicles. The maneuver support company is equipped with 120 mm mortars and Spike MR anti-tank guided missiles.

== See also ==
- Alpine Brigade "Taurinense"
