= Monte Politri =

Mountain in Italy

- Bric Rosso
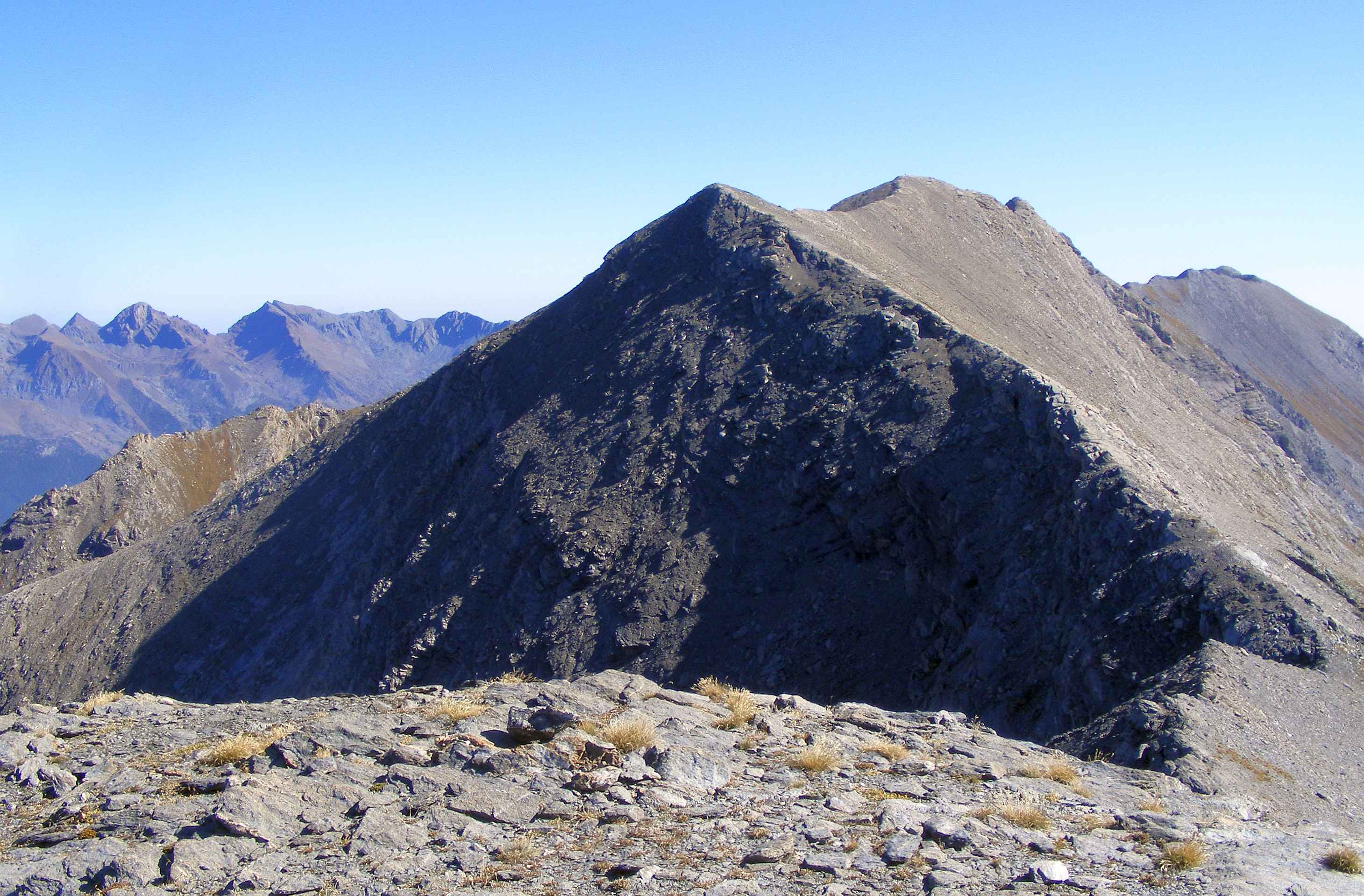
- The mountain as seen from Fea Nera

Highest point
- Elevation: 3,026 m (9,928 ft)
- Prominence: 313 m (1,027 ft)
- Parent peak: Monte Albergian
- Isolation: 2.77 km (1.72 mi)
- Listing: Alpine mountains above 3000 m
- Coordinates: 44°59′28.28″N 07°01′7.36″E

Geography
- Location within Alps
- Location: Piedmont, Italy
- Parent range: Cottian Alps

Climbing
- Easiest route: Scrambling

Monte Politri or Bric Rosso is a 3,026 m a.s.l. mountain of the Cottian Alps, located in Italy.

== Geography ==
The mountain is located on the ridge between Val Chisone (North) and Valle Germanasca (South). Going West an unnamed saddle at 2863 divides Monte Politri from Fea Nera (2,946 m a.s.l.), while going East another saddle at 2,880 m separates it from Truc Cialabrie (2,936 m a.s.l.).

Administratively the north face of the mountain belongs to the Fenestrelle municipality (comune) and the South one to Massello municipality, both in the Metropolitan City of Turin. In clear days its summit offers a good view of Western Alps, a little limited towards NW by the neighbouring Monte Albergian.

=== SOIUSA classification ===
According to SOIUSA (International Standardized Mountain Subdivision of the Alps) the mountain can be classified in the following way:

- main part = Western Alps
- major sector = North Western Alps
- section = Cottian Alps
- subsection = Alpi del Monginevro
- supergroup = Catena Bucie-Grand Queyron-Orsiera
- group = Gruppo Queyron-Albergian-Sestrière
- subgroup = Sottogruppo Ghinivert-Albergian
- code = I/A-4.II-A.2.b

== Access to the summit ==
The usual route to Monte Politri starts from Colle dell'Albergian (2,713 m), which can be reached by waymarked footpath starting either from Balsiglia (Valle Germanasca) or from Laux (Val Chisone. While long from both these starting points, the route does not require alpine skills but just scrambling. In the Italian scale of hiking difficulty is rated EE (Escursionisti Esperti, namely suitable for expert hikers). Several climbing routes were described around the mountain, ranging from PD- to D+ grade.

== Maps ==
- Istituto Geografico Militare (IGM) official maps of Italy, 1:25.000 and 1:100.000 scale, on-line version
- Istituto Geografico Centrale - Carta dei sentieri e dei rifugi scala 1:50.000 n. 1 Valli di Susa Chisone e Germanasca
