= Massello =

- Comune
- Comune di Massello
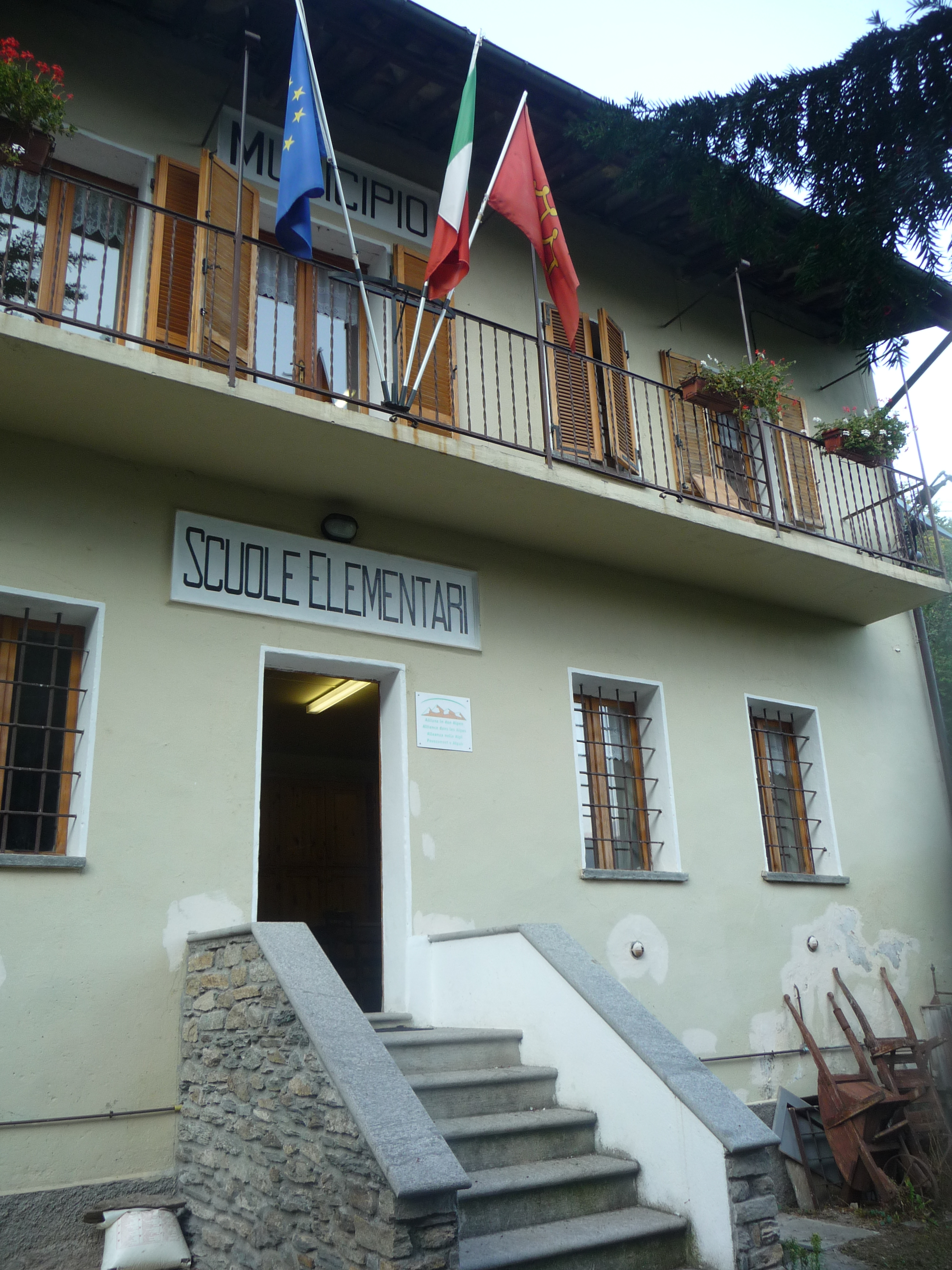
- Town hall

- Coat of arms

- Location within Italy Location within Piedmont
- Coordinates: 44°58′N 7°3′E
- Country: Italy
- Region: Piedmont
- Metropolitan city: Turin (TO)

Government
  - Mayor: Enrico Boetto

Area
  - Total: 38.26 km^{2} (14.77 sq mi)
- Elevation: 1,188 m (3,898 ft)

Population (31 May 2021)
  - Total: 56
  - Density: 1.5/km^{2} (3.8/sq mi)
- Demonym: Massellini
- Time zone: UTC+1 (CET)
  - Summer (DST): UTC+2 (CEST)
- Postal code: 10060
- Dialing code: 0121
- Patron saint: Sts. Peter and Paul
- Saint day: 29 June
- Website: Official website

Massello is a comune (municipality) in the Metropolitan City of Turin in the Italian region Piedmont, located about 50 km west of Turin, in the Valle Germanasca.

Massello borders the following municipalities: Pragelato, Roure, Fenestrelle, Perrero, and Salza di Pinerolo.

== See also ==
- Bric Ghinivert
- Monte Politri
