= Parco naturale Val Troncea =

Parco nazionale Val Troncea
- IUCN category V (protected landscape/seascape)
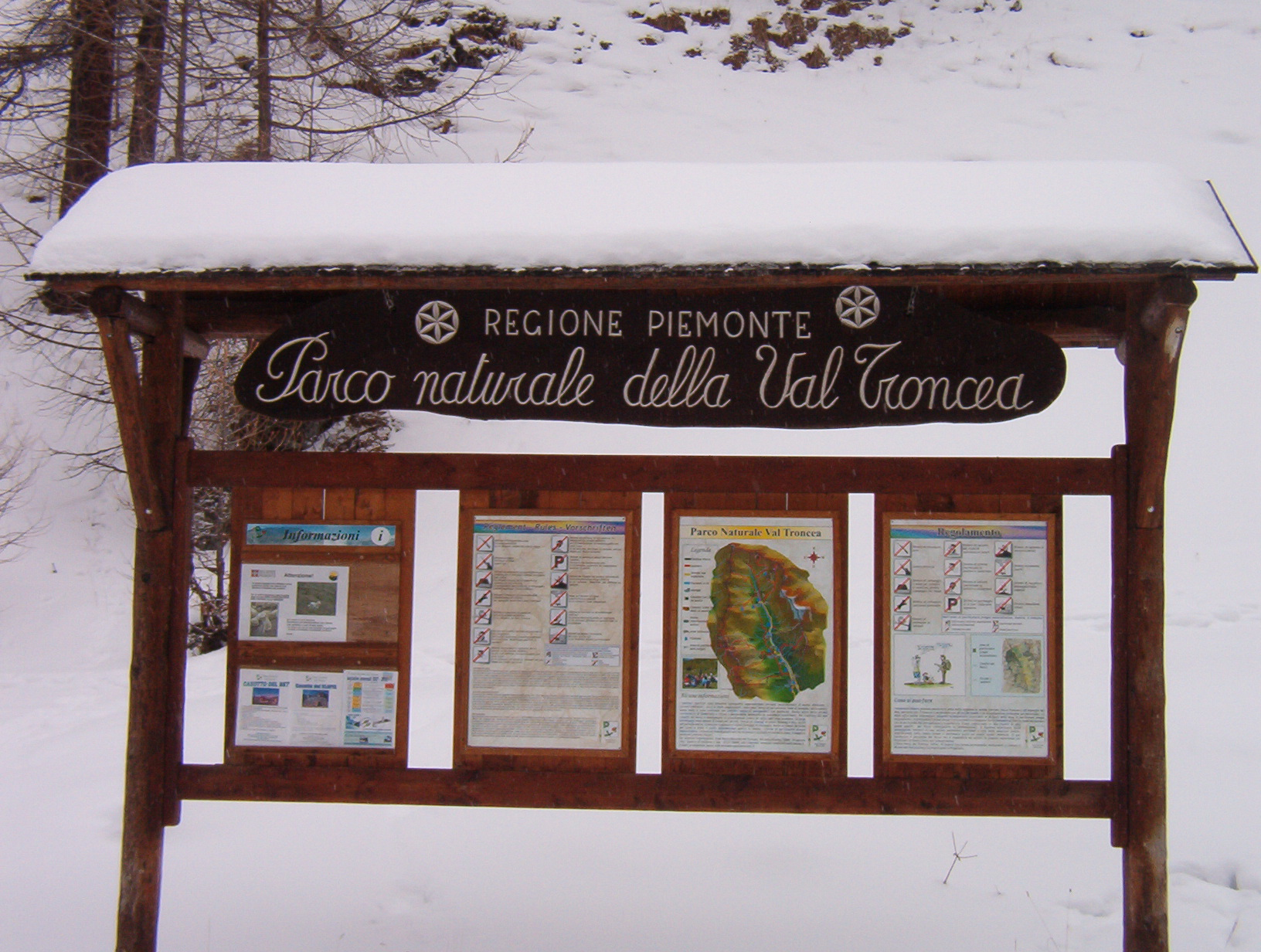

- Location within Italy
- Location: Piedmont
- Nearest city: Turin
- Coordinates: 45°30′10″N 9°18′36″E
- Established: 1980
- Governing body: Ente di gestione del Parco naturale della Val Troncea
- Website: www.parconaturalevaltroncea.it

The nature park Parco naturale Val Troncea is located in Val Chisone, municipality of Pragelato in the Metropolitan City of Turin. The park was created in 1980 to preserve the natural environment.

== Geography ==
The park is located between 1670 AMSL and 3.280 m AMSL. The highest point is the peak of the mountain Punta Rognosa di Sestriere. The river Chisone seeps at the very end of the valley, at the foot of Monte Barifreddo and runs through it until it reaches the river Pellice.

== Hiking ==
The nature park has a lot of hiking paths, both linking the different hamlets with each other, or the bottom of the valley with the mountains' peaks.

=== Landmarks ===
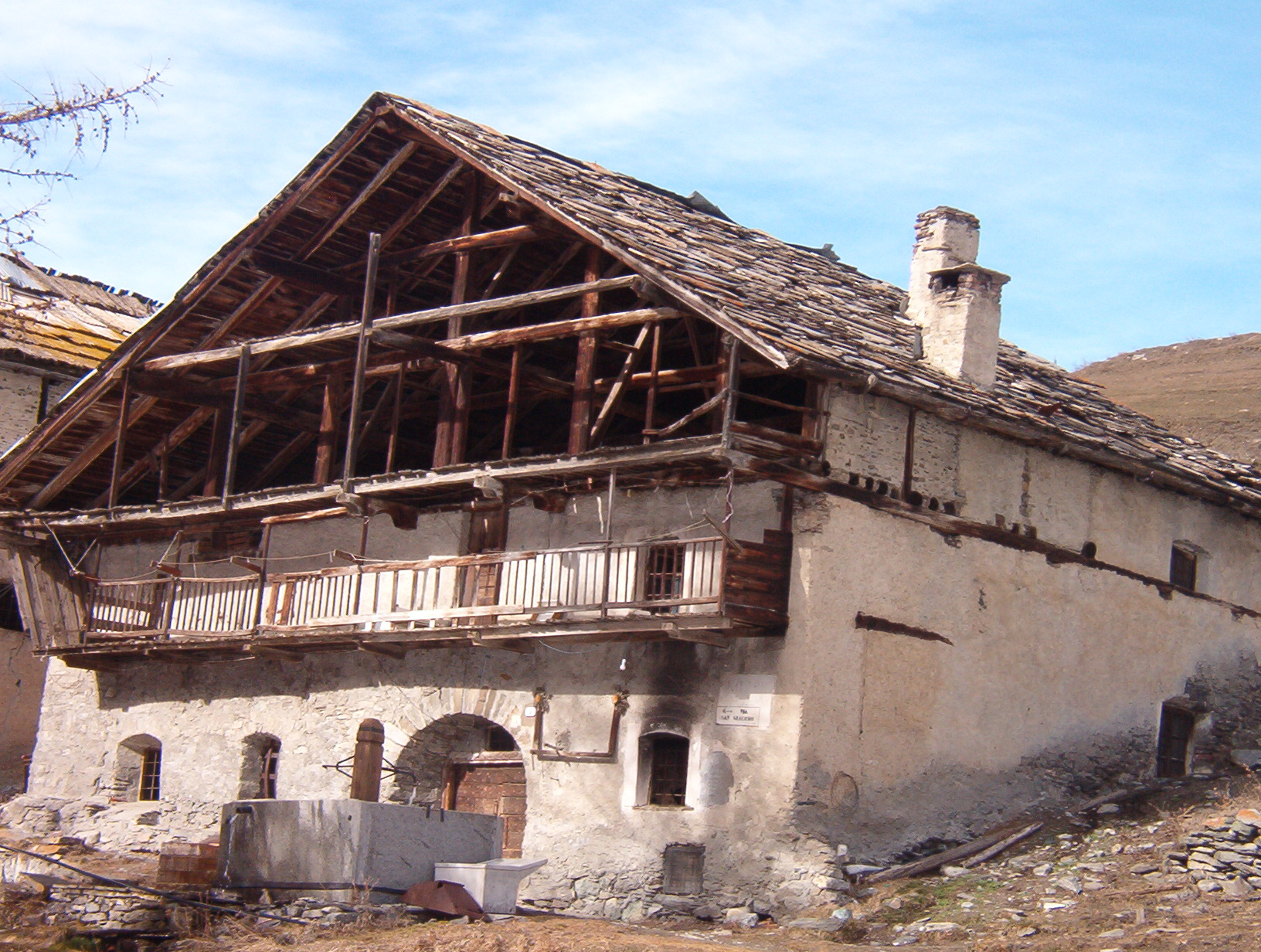
Typical house in Laval

In the park can still be found old hamlets, representing the valley's lifestyle and architecture:

- Laval - 1,667 m
- Seytes - 1,919 m
- Troncea - 1,915 m
- Jussaud - 1,786 m
- Alpe Mei

Alpe Mei is located at the end of the valley and is inhabited just in summer. It can be reached within a two-hour walk. The shepherds produce and sell typical mountain cheese such as ricotta and toma.

=== Mountain huts ===
- Hut Troncea

This hut is located in the old hamlet of Troncea and offers a restaurant service.

Two smaller mountain huts can just be used to stay overnight, by asking for the keys to the park headquarters in Pragelato.

- Hut Col del Clapis – 2,756 m
- Hut Col del Beth – 2,785 m, near Bric Ghinivert

== Transportation ==
The Sapav bus Turin–Sestriere links the hamlet of Traverse.

In August, the park is organizing a shuttle-bus service for tourists, that links the entrance of the valley to the very end (Alpe Mei).
