= Chisone =

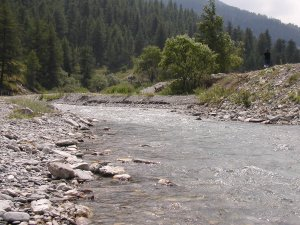

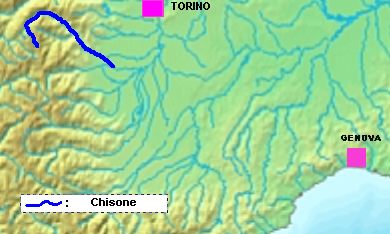
- Chisone location within northwestern Italy

Location
- Country: Italy

Physical characteristics
- Source
  - location: Cottian Alps at the foot of Monte Barifreddo
- Mouth: Pellice
  - coordinates: 44.8197°N 7.4180°E
- Length: 53.2 km (33.1 mi)
- Basin size: 604.38 km^{2} (233.35 mi^{2})
- Discharge
  - average: (mouth) 12.30 m^{3}/s (434 cu ft/s)

Basin features
- Progression: Pellice
- Tributaries
  - right: Germanasca

The Chisone (in Piedmontese Chison or Cleson) is a 53-kilometre (33 mi) Italian torrent, which runs through Pragelato, Fenestrelle, Perosa Argentina and Pinerolo in the Metropolitan City of Turin. It is a tributary of the Pellice, which in turn is a tributary of the river Po. Although classified as a torrent, there is no period of the year in which the Chisone runs dry.

== Geography ==
The stream is formed at the foot of Monte Barifreddo in the Cottian Alps and initially runs north-northwest through the Parco Naturale della Val Troncea. The course then follows a semi-circular path through the Val Chisone passing to the east, the north and then to the west of Monte Albergian. Near Perosa Argentina it receives the waters of the Germanasca, its main tributary. The Chisone enters the Pellice some 15 kilometres (9 mi) to the east of Pinerolo, the most important of the settlements on its course.

The valley formed by the river, running from Pragelato to the Po Valley, is known as Val Chisone.

== Bibliography ==
The Italian article cites among its sources:

- Torino, I.G.C., Cartina n. 1 Valli di Susa, Chisone e Germanasca,
