= Germanasca =

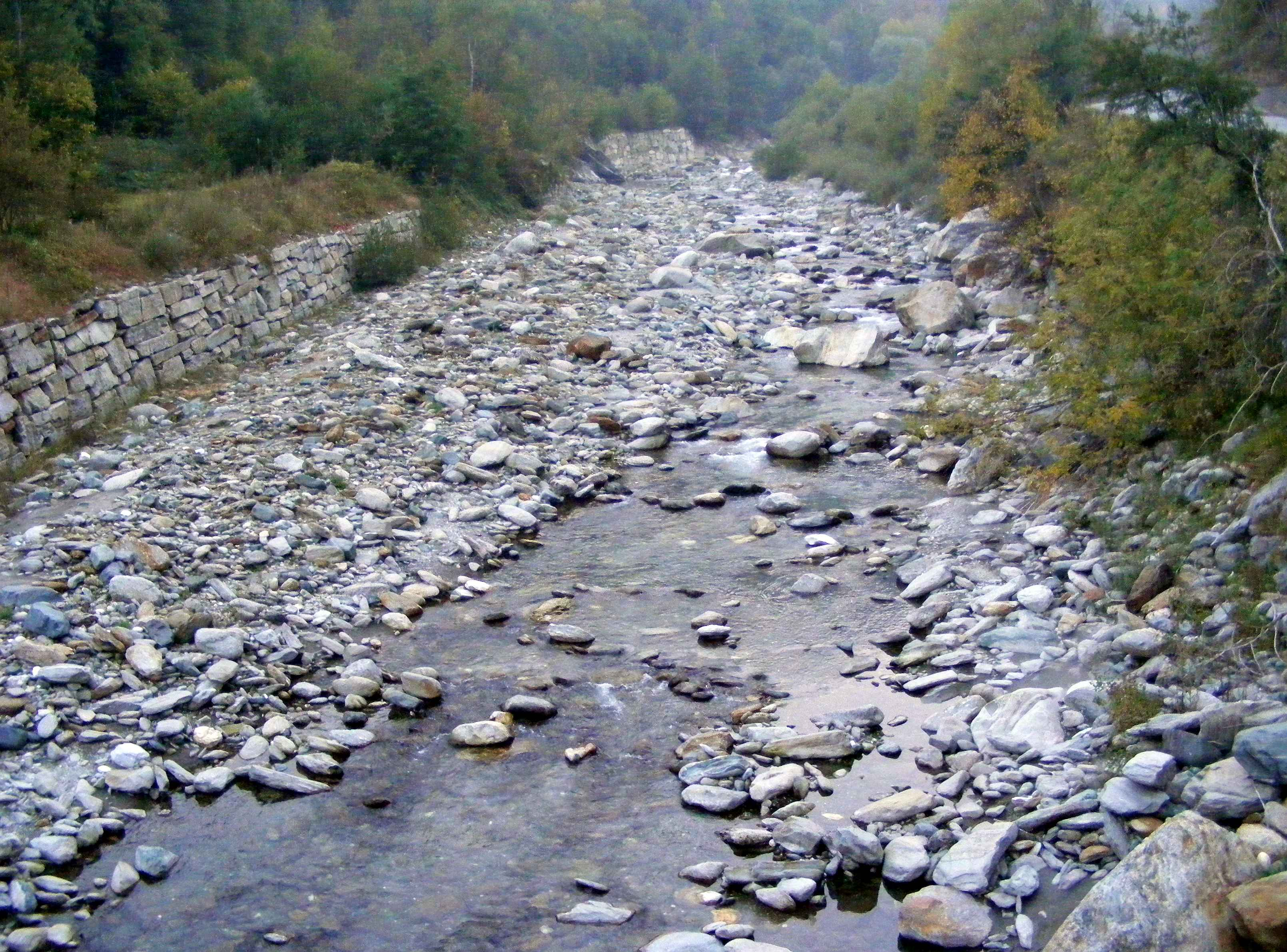
- The river at Perrero

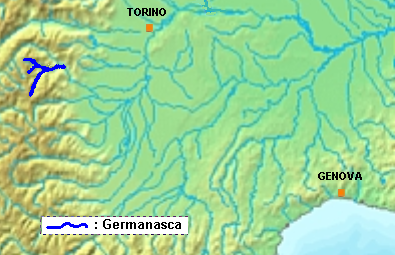
- Germanasca location within northwestern Italy

Location
- Country: Italy

Physical characteristics
- Source
  - location: Lago Verde
  - elevation: 2,590 m (8,500 ft)
- Mouth: Chisone
  - coordinates: 44°57′13″N 7°11′20″E
  - elevation: 597 m (1,959 ft)
- Length: 26.6 km (16.5 mi)

Basin features
- Progression: Chisone→ Pellice→ Po→ Adriatic Sea

The Germanasca (also in Piedmontese Germanasca) is a 27 km (17 mi) Italian torrent, which runs through the Metropolitan City of Turin. It is a tributary of the Chisone, into which it flows near Perosa Argentina. The valley formed by the river is known as Val Germanasca.

== Geography ==
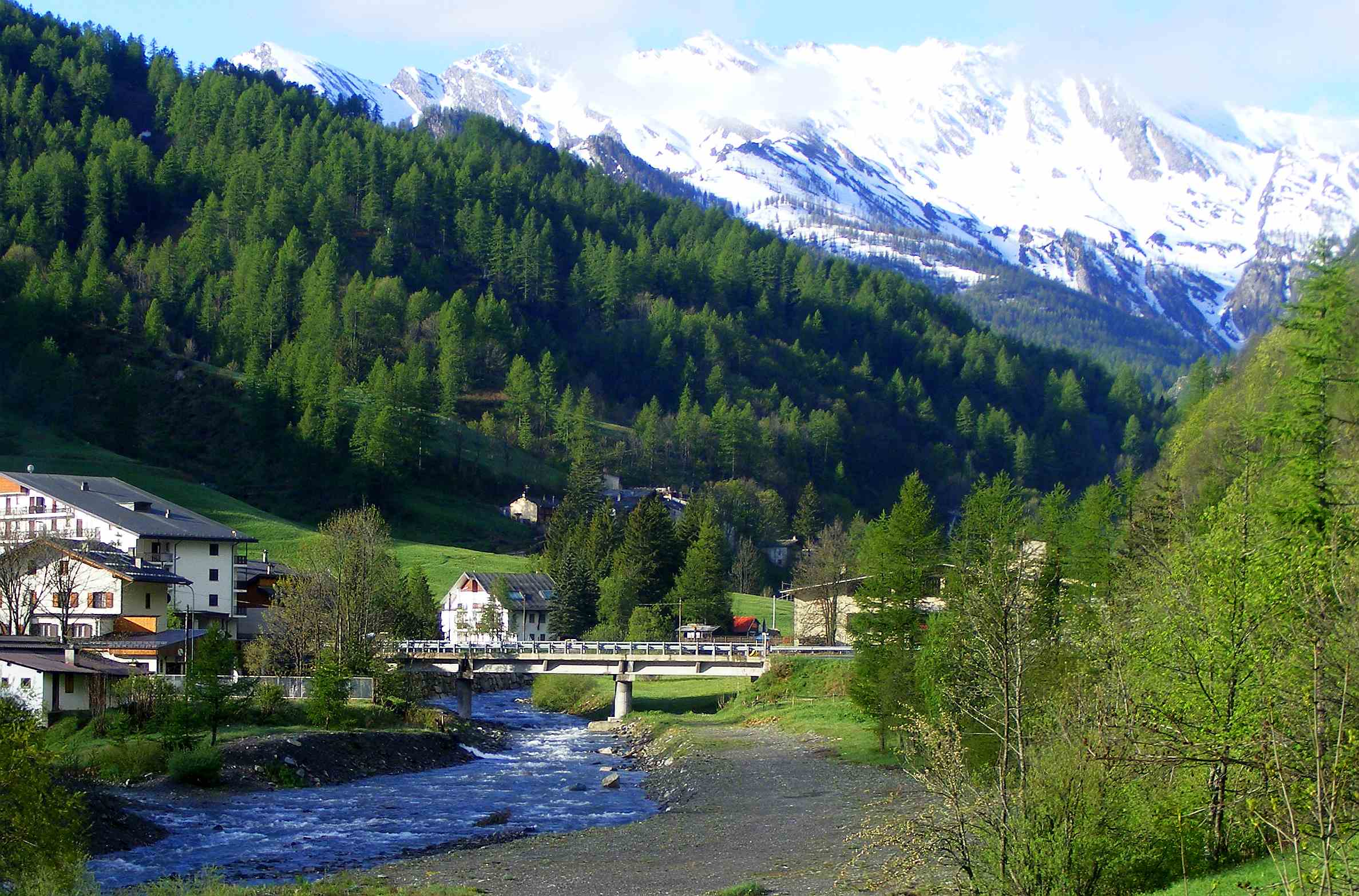
The Germanasca near Prali

The stream is formed from Lago Verde, a small Alpine lake in the Cottian Alps, and initially runs northwards, before reaching the comune of Salza di Pinerolo and turning east. It then receives the waters of the Germanasca di Salza and Germanasca di Massello increasing a lot its average discharge. After the end of its course through the Germanasca Valley it reaches the Chisone at Perosa Argentina.

== Other projects ==
Media related to Germanasca at Wikimedia Commons
