= Val Chisone =

Alpine valley in Piedmont (Italy)

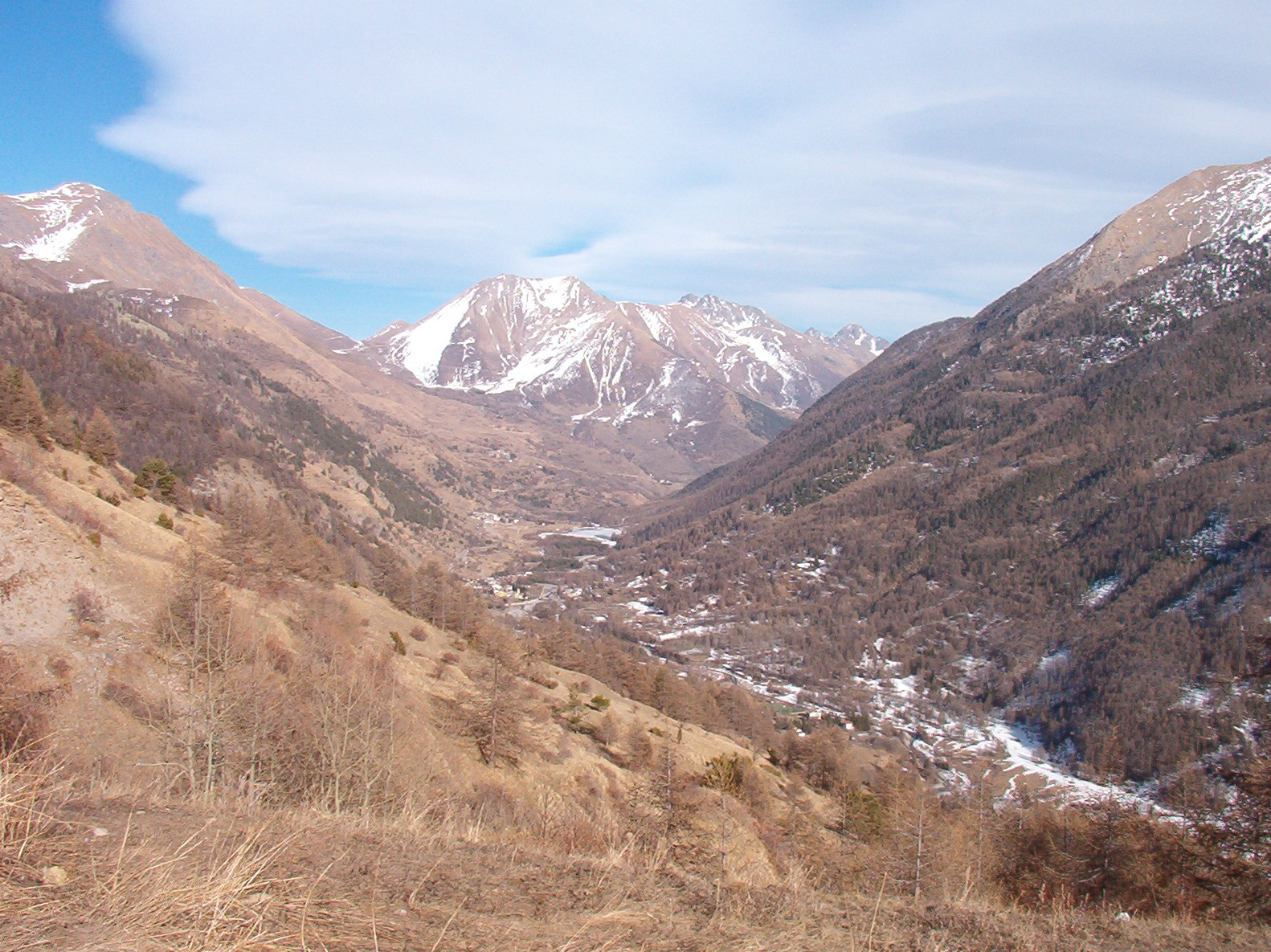
- Val Chisone from Grand Puy (Pragelato)

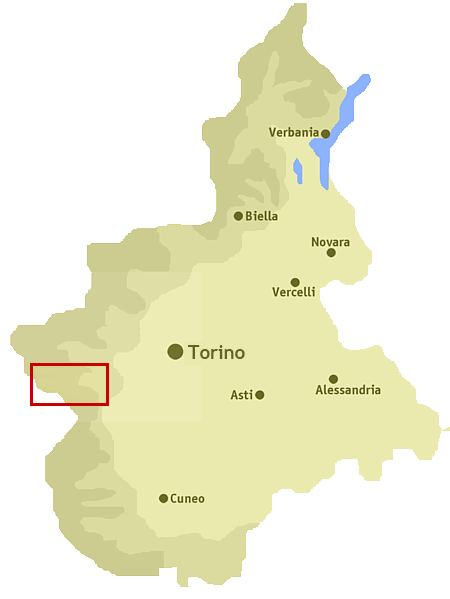
- Location in the Piedmont region

Geography
- Population centers: Pinerolo, Fenestrelle, Pragelato, Sestriere
- Coordinates: 45°0′N 7°8′E
- Rivers: Chisone

The Val Chisone is one of the Occitan valleys of western Piedmont, situated in the Cottian Alps in the Metropolitan City of Turin in north-west Italy.

== Geography ==
Traditionally, the valley's entrances are considered the towns of Pinerolo and Sestriere. It is bounded by the Val di Susa (to which it is connected by the Sestriere Pass, at 2,035 metres (6,677 ft)) to the north and east, the Val Sangone to the north, the Val Pellice to the south, while eastwards is the plain of the Po Valley.

The valley is crossed by the torrent from which it takes its name, the Chisone. The valley has a main branch, the Valle Germanasca, and a smaller branch in the area of Pragelato, Parco naturale Val Troncea, a nature park, an ideal destination for hikers, snowshoe hikers and cross-country skiers.

== History ==
For centuries the Val Chisone was an object of contention between the Duchy of Savoy and the Kingdom of France. The upper valley (Val Pragelato) was part of the French Dauphiné, while the lower valley (Val Perosa) was under Savoyard control. In 1631, the right shore of the Val Perosa was ceded to King Louis XIII, returning under Savoy by the Peace of Turin (1696).

The upper Val Chisone was part of the semi-independent French state of the Escartons Republic from 1343 to 1713. Pragelato was one of the five cantons. The Republic was annexed to Savoy in 1713.

The valley, together with Val Germanasca and Val Pellice, is home to a large Waldensian community.

== Tourism ==
=== Hiking ===
The valley has a lot of hiking destinations. Some of the most important mountains are:

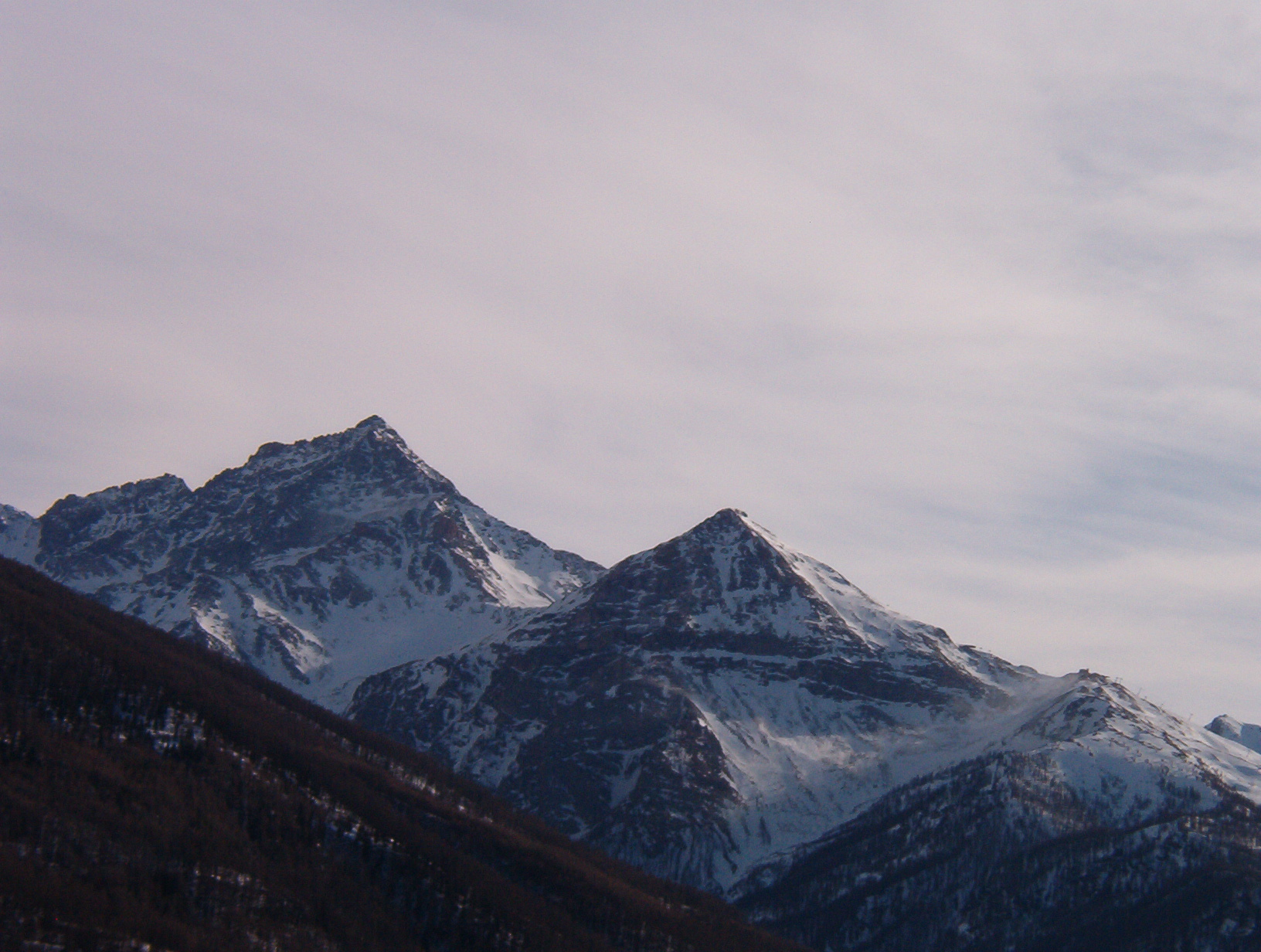
Punta Rognosa di Sestriere.

- Rognosa di Sestriere – 3,280 m
- Monte Albergian – 3,041 m
- Bric Ghinivert – 3,037 m
- Monte Barifreddo – 3,028 m
- Monte Politri – 3,026 m
- Monte Fraiteve – 2,701 m
- Monte Genevris – 2,356 m
- Monte Orsiera – 2,878 m
- Punta Cristalliera – 2,801 m
- Cima Ciantiplagna – 2,849 m
- Becco dell'Aquila – 2,809 m
- Punta Vallette – 2,743 m
- Monte Français Pelouxe – 2,736 m
- Testa dell'Assietta – 2,566 m
- Grand Truc – 2,366 m
- Punta dell'Aquila – 2,119 m

=== Winter Sports ===
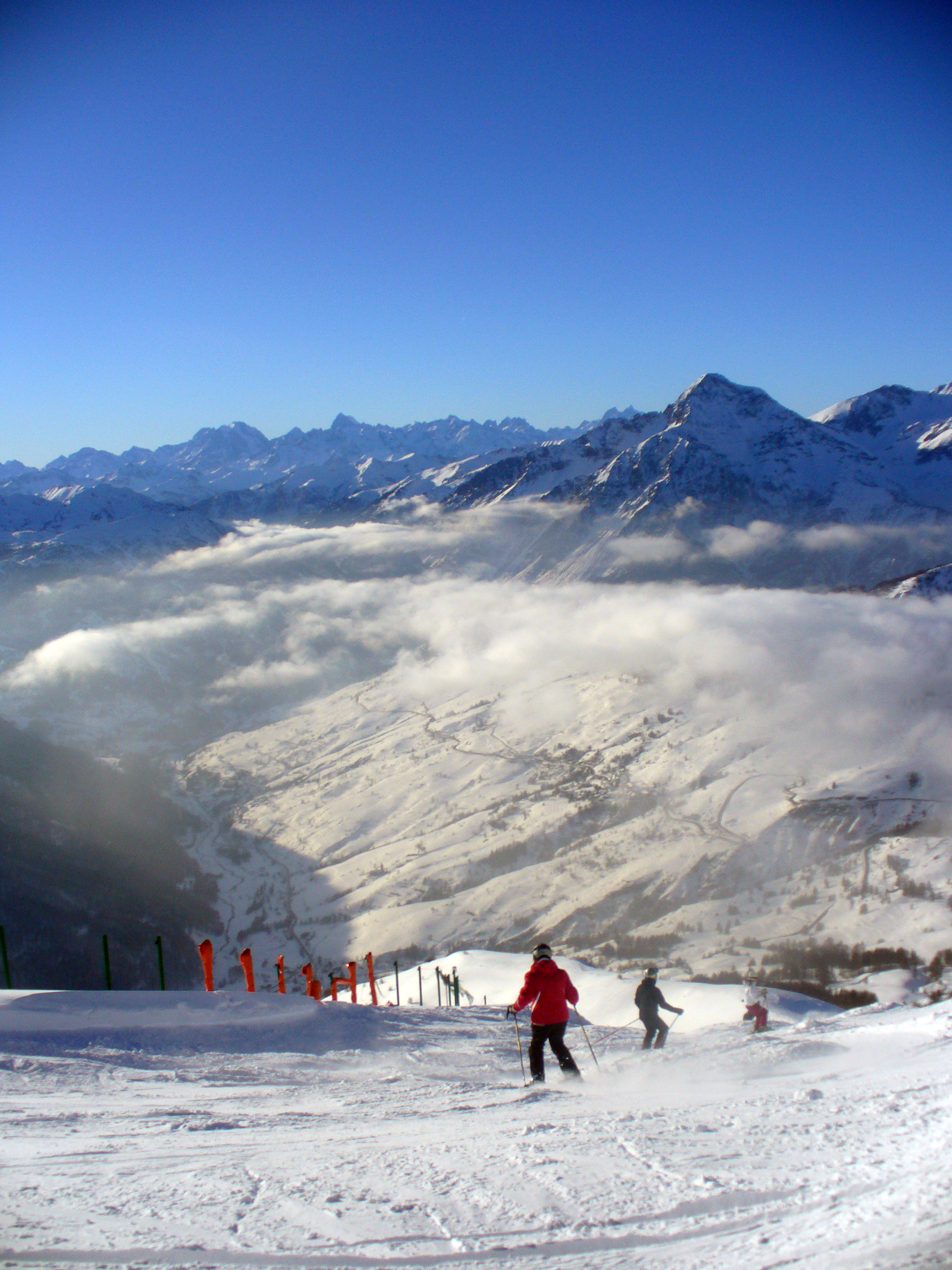
Monte Motta, Sestriere.

Val Chisone is renowned for winter sports: in 2006 several competitions within the XX Olympic Winter Games took place in Pinerolo, Pragelato and Sestriere.

Sestriere's huge skiing area hosted the alpine skiing. The area is part of the Via Lattea, a ski resort that comprises more than 163 skiing connected courses (41 blue, 92 red and 30 black slopes) and whose altitude ranges from 1,380 metres (4,530 ft) in Cesana to 2,800 metres (9,200 ft) on top of the Motta course. The slopes in Sestriere also regularly host FIS Alpine Ski World Cup events.

Pragelato hosted cross-country skiing, Nordic combined (cross-country skiing) and ski jumping. The ski jumping area was used in the later years for other competitions.

Pragelato offers 15 km (9 mi) of touristic cross-country pistes from approximately 1,530 to 1,750 metres (5,020 to 5,740 ft) above sea level. Besides the link with Via Lattea through cableway, the municipality has its own alpine ski courses (one chairlift and three platter lifts).

Pinerolo hosted curling.

Some huts are open in winter and are a destination for snowshoe hikers:

- Rifugio Selleries – 2,030 m

== Gallery ==
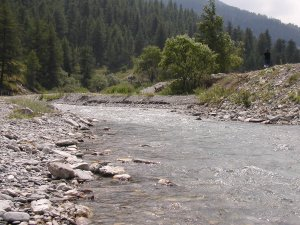
River Chisone in Pragelato.

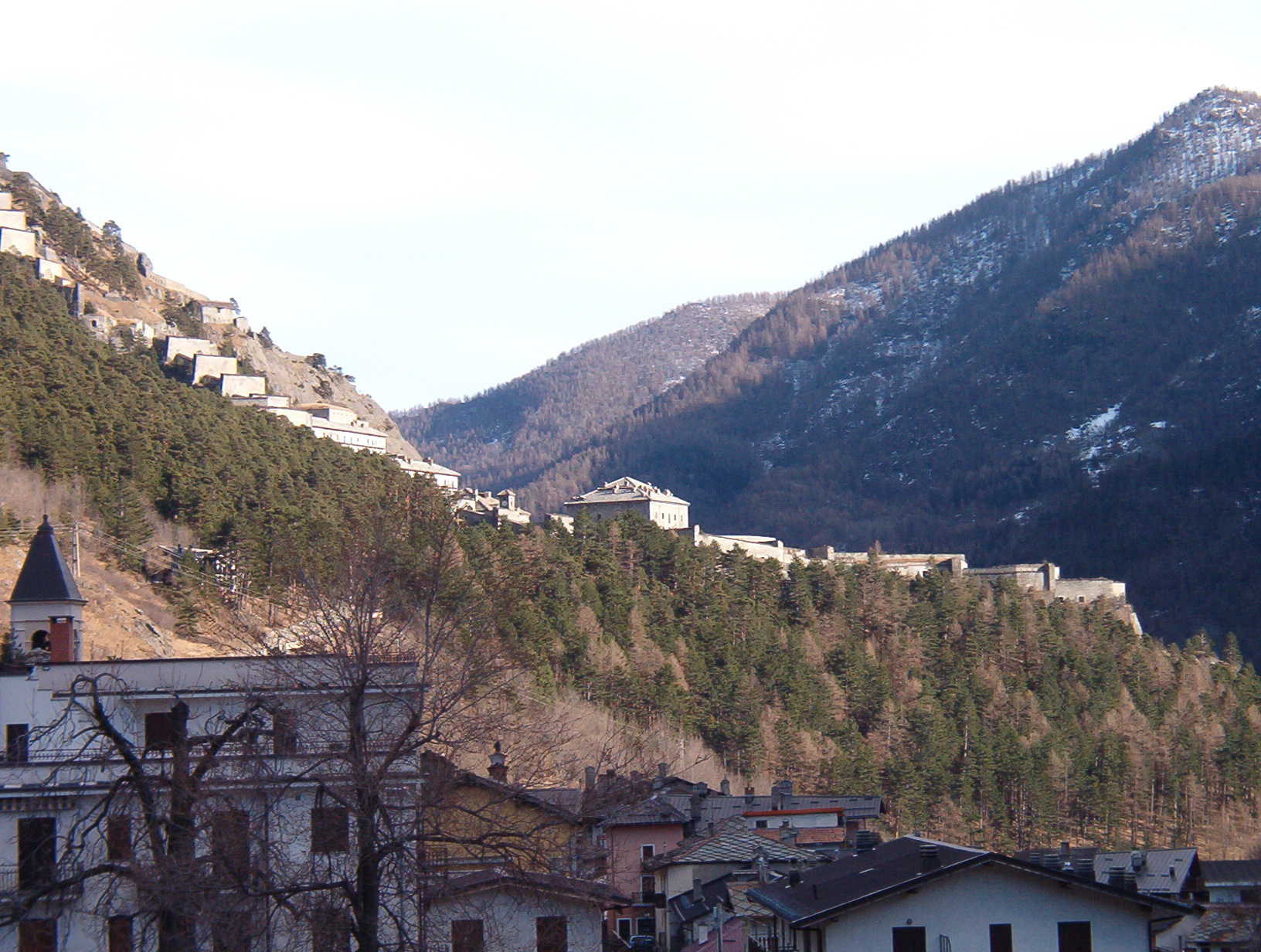
The fort of Fenestrelle.
