= Monte Albergian =

Mountain in Italy

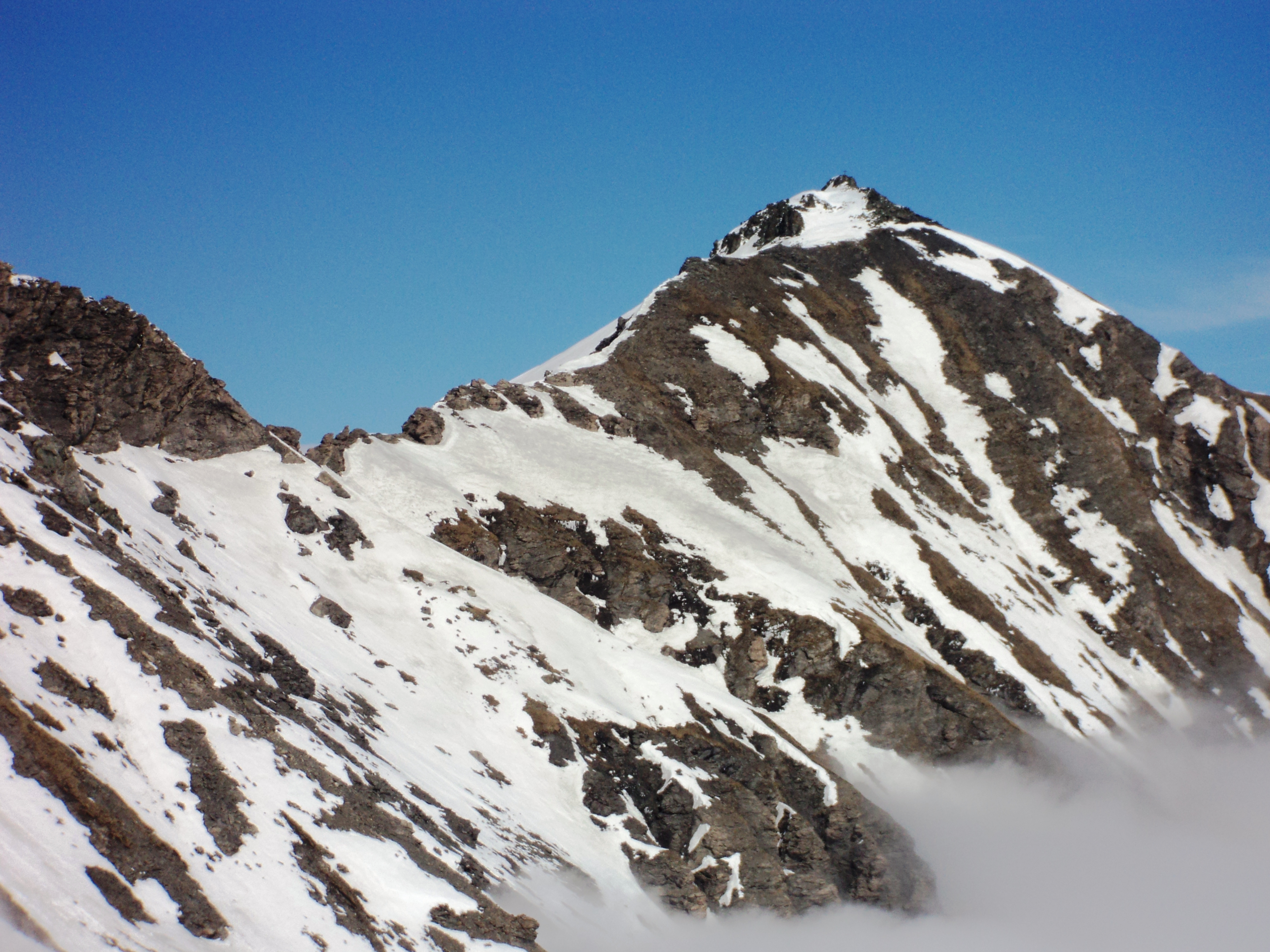
- The mountain as seen from Colle dell'Albergian

Highest point
- Elevation: 3,041 m (9,977 ft)
- Prominence: 428 m (1,404 ft)
- Isolation: 9.29 km (5.77 mi)
- Listing: Alpine mountains above 3000 m
- Coordinates: 44°58′58.8″N 06°58′58.8″E

Geography
- Location within Alps
- Location: Piedmont, Italy
- Parent range: Cottian Alps

Climbing
- Easiest route: footpath

Monte Albergian is a 3,041 m a.s.l. mountain of the Cottian Alps, located in Italy. A battalion of 3rd Alpini Regiment, which during World War I earned a Silver Medal of Military Valor, was named after Monte Albergian.

== Etymology ==
The name Albergian could come from the ancient Celtic population of the Egyans (in Italian Egidini) and could mean High Egyans' mountain (Alberg-Egyan) in their language. Another theory link the name of the mountain the Janus, a Roman solar deity.

== Geography ==
The mountain is located on a brief ridge heading North which originates from the water divide between Val Chisone and Valle Germanasca. Going South an unnamed saddle at 2,906 m divides Monte Albergian from Monte Gran Miuls (2,974 m a.s.l.), the latter standing on the Germanasca/Chisone water divide.

Administratively the eastern face of the Albergian belongs to the Fenestrelle municipality (comune) and the western one to Pragelato municipality, both in the Metropolitan City of Turin. In clear days its summit, marked by a cross, offers a great view of Western Alps.

=== SOIUSA classification ===
According to SOIUSA (International Standardized Mountain Subdivision of the Alps) the mountain can be classified in the following way:

- main part = Western Alps
- major sector = North Western Alps
- section = Cottian Alps
- subsection = Alpi del Monginevro
- supergroup = Catena Bucie-Grand Queyron-Orsiera
- group = Gruppo Queyron-Albergian-Sestrière
- subgroup = Sottogruppo Ghinivert-Albergian
- code = I/A-4.II-A.2.b

== Access to the summit ==
The usual route to Monte Albergian is the waymarked footpath starting from Soucheres Hautes (1,518 m), a frazione (village) of Pragelato municipality. While long (more than 1,500 metres of vertical drop) the route does not require alpine skills. In the Italian scale of hiking difficulty is rated E (Escursionisti, namely suitable for normal hikers). On the WSW ridge of Albergian was described a climbing route of F+ grade.

== Photo gallery ==
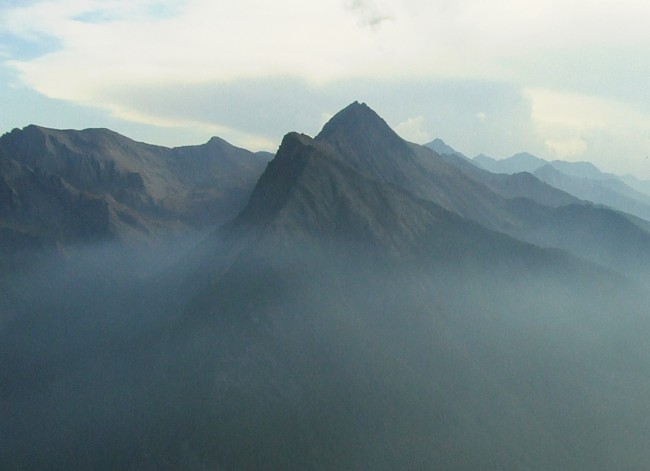
Albergian from Colle delle Finestre

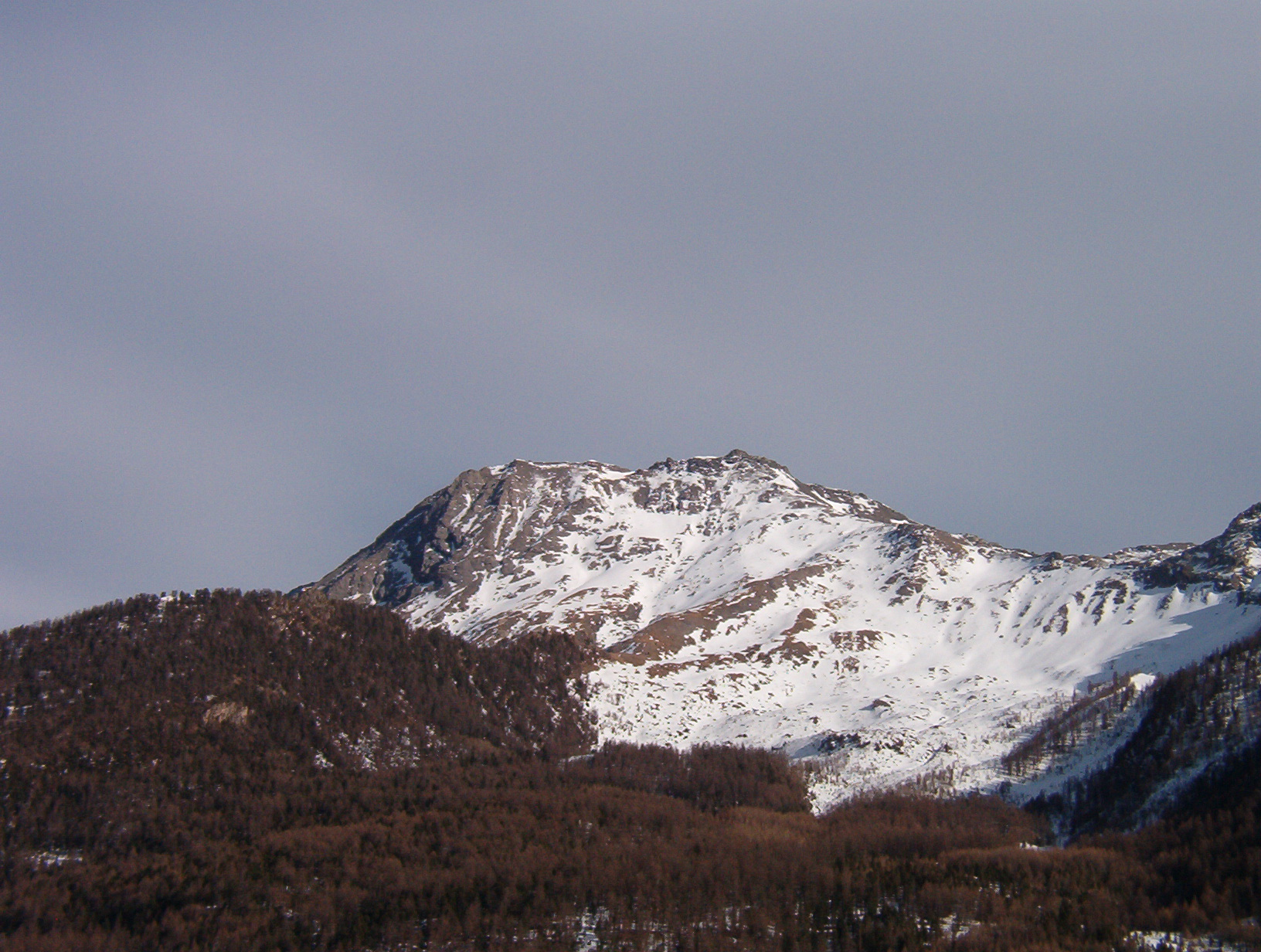
The mountain seen from Gran Puy (a frazione of Pragelato)

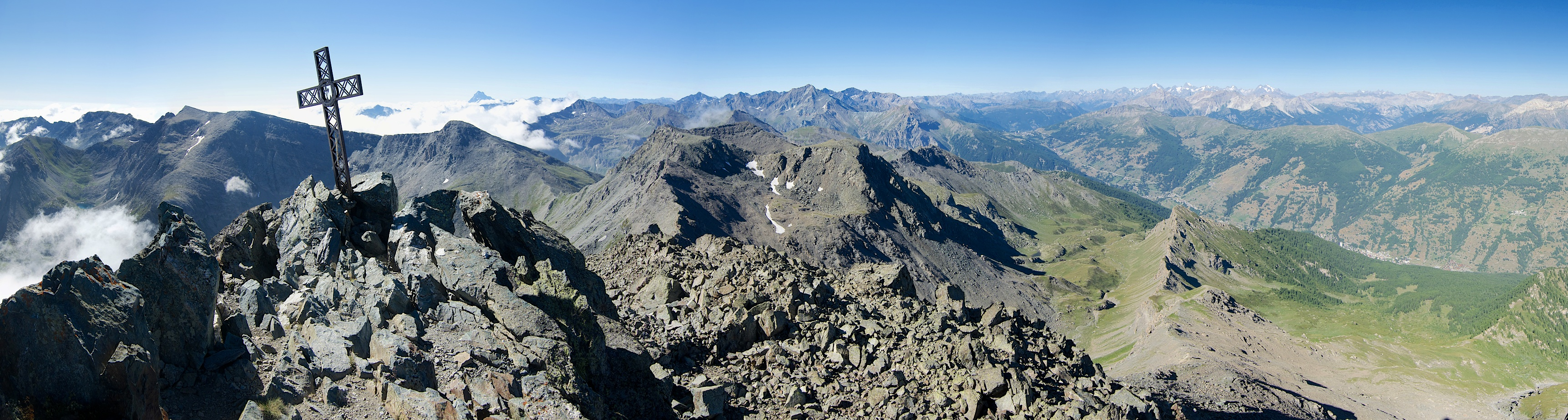
Summit cross and panorama

== Maps ==
- Istituto Geografico Militare (IGM) official maps of Italy, 1:25.000 and 1:100.000 scale, on-line version
- Istituto Geografico Centrale (I.G.C.) - Carta dei sentieri e dei rifugi scala 1:50.000 n. 1 Valli di Susa Chisone e Germanasca
