= Perosa Argentina =

- Comune
- Comune di Perosa Argentina
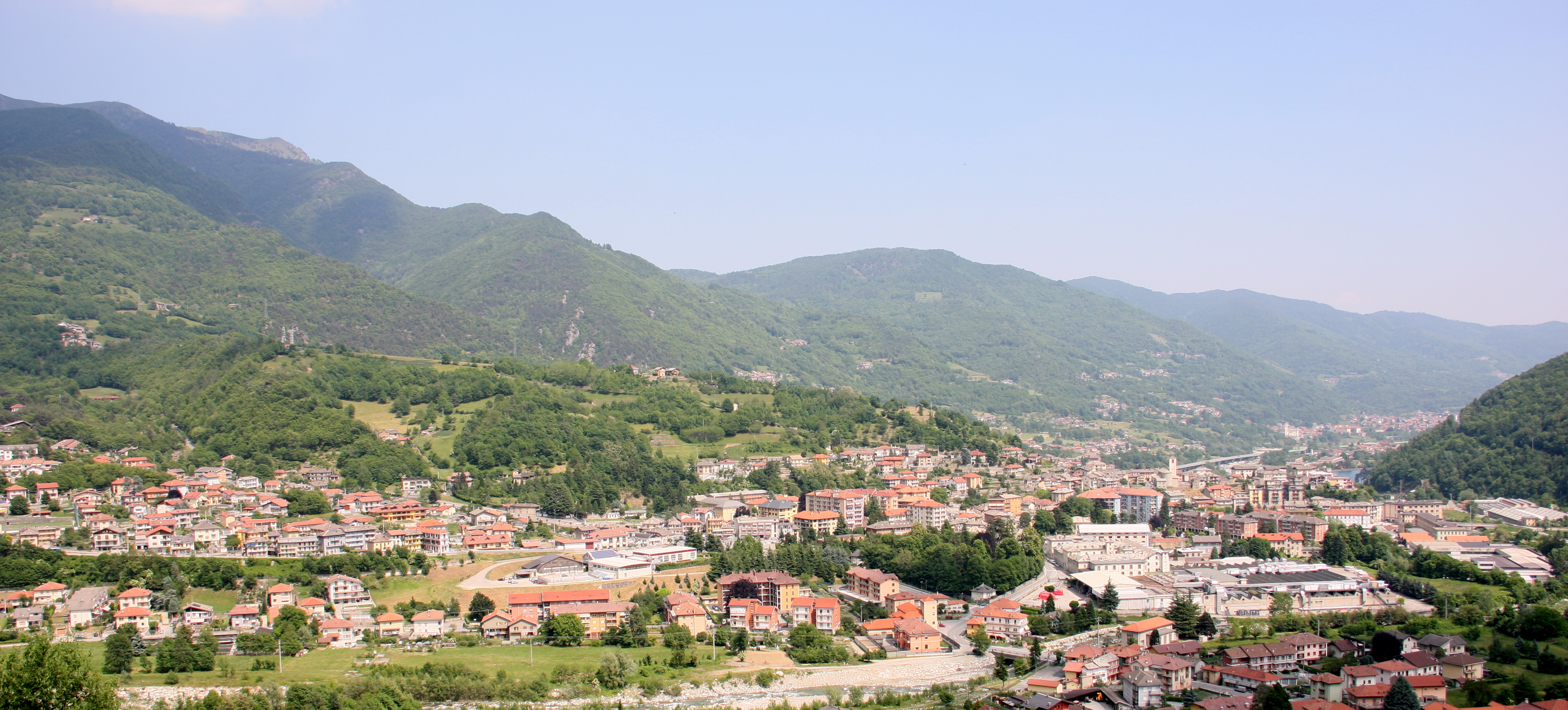

- Coat of arms

- Location within Italy Location within Piedmont
- Coordinates: 44°57′N 7°12′E
- Country: Italy
- Region: Piedmont
- Metropolitan city: Turin (TO)
- Frazioni: Meano

Government
  - Mayor: Nadia Brunetto

Area
  - Total: 26.09 km^{2} (10.07 sq mi)
- Elevation: 630 m (2,070 ft)

Population (30 June 2023)
  - Total: 3,061
  - Density: 117.3/km^{2} (303.9/sq mi)
- Demonym: Perosini
- Time zone: UTC+1 (CET)
  - Summer (DST): UTC+2 (CEST)
- Postal code: 10063
- Dialing code: 0121
- Patron saint: St Genesius
- Saint day: 22 August
- Website: Official website

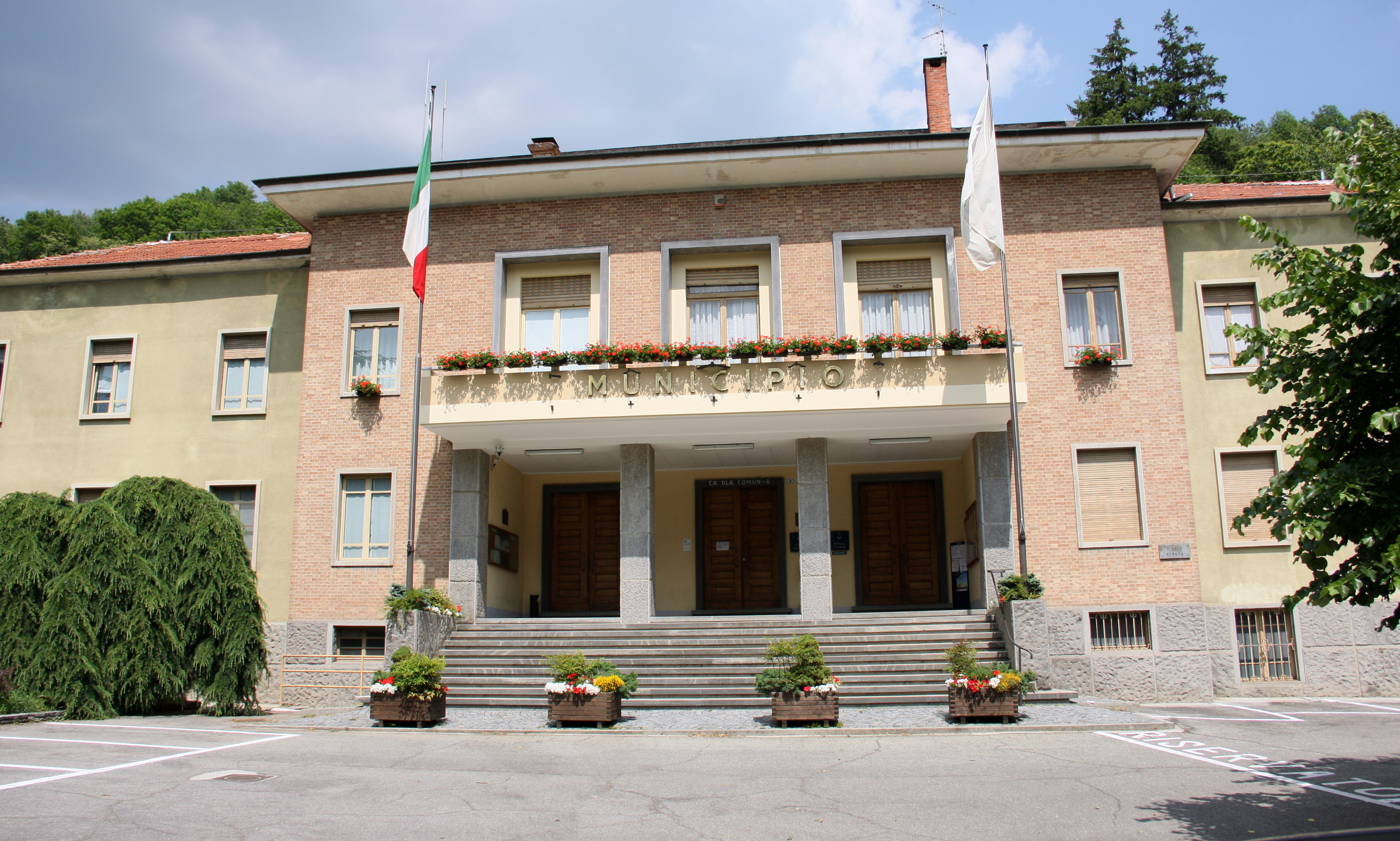
City hall of Perosa Argentina

Perosa Argentina (French: Pérouse) is a comune (municipality) in the Metropolitan City of Turin in the Italian region Piedmont, located about 40 kilometres (25 mi) northwest of Turin, in the val Chisone. The population of the village is 3061 (30 June 2023).

It is located in the Val Chisone area and it is part of the Mountain Community of Valleys Chisone and Germanasca, which has been part of the Mountain Community of Pinerolo since 2010. Currently reconstituted under the name of the Mountain Union of Valleys Chisone and Germanasca, it is a group of municipalities that includes Fenestrelle, Inverso Pinasca, Massello, Perrero, Pinasca, Pomaretto, Porte, Prali, Pramollo, Roure, Salza di Pinerolo, San Germano Chisone, Usseaux e Villar Perosa.

== Origin of the name ==
The term "Perosa" comes from the word peira, that means "stone" in Occitan, referring to a cobblestone road. Instead, the following term "Argentina" tell us about the ancient silver mine on the slopes of Bocciarda Mountain: we also find this information looking at the town coat of arms, where we can indeed see three silver stones on a black wallpaper with the quote Dant fructus lapides, which means "stones bear fruits". This second part of the name was added on 11 April 1862, one year after the birth of the Kingdom of Italy.

== History ==
Perosa is mentioned for the first time in a document dated September 8, 1064, in which Countess Adelaide of Savoy (1092–1154), widow of Oddone of Savoy, granted to the Benedictine Abbey of S. Maria di Pinerolo, founded by her, all rights of feudal sovereignty and land ownership over the people and things of the valleys of Perosa and S. Martino. The reference is to "Petrosa", indicating the nature of the mountain landscape, and Podium Odonis, named after Adelaide's husband, to designate the hill of Perosa Alta.

The small village was watched over by a castle and in its center stood the church, already dedicated to St. Genesius.

At Adelaide's death, Tommaso I of Savoy succeeded in regaining possession of the ancient family territories, included Pinerolo. At the end of the 13th century, the Waldensian presence in the valleys must have constituted a matter far from negligible, as evidenced by the decision to send an inquisitor to Perosa in 1297. However, threats, fines, confiscation of property and torture did not yield the expected results. So much so that, ninety years later, in 1387, the inquisitor Antonio di Settimo lamented that many inhabitants not only adhered to heresy but were even spreading it in the neighboring valleys. During this period of time (1301–1418), Acaja princes, cadet branch of the House of Savoy, extended their domains to almost all of Piedmont territory using arms and marriages.

This border land disputed between the Dauphiné and the House of Savoy suffered because of this long rivalry. The population paid a high price in term of human lives, owing to wars, epidemics and misery, all consequences of international policy choices.

Between XVI and XVII century, the situations in this tormented land was very complex: comings and goings of different armies, alternation of governors, 38 years of French dominance with Francis I and the triumphal entry of Emmanuel Philibert in Pinerolo on 1 January 1575; the establishment in the valley of Capuchin missions, aimed at curbing the spread of the Reformed religion, took place following the persecutions by Charles Emmanuel I against the Waldensian population. The Waldensians were confined to lands on the right side of the river Chisone and were forced, in part, to emigrate far away. This led to the founding of the village of Perouse in Germany, within the municipality of Rutesheim.

During such tumultuous events, Perosa was besieged twice by French troops: in 1592 by Lesdiguières, who descended into the valley to repel ambitious Savoyard attempts to occupy the Val Pragelato (belonging to France until Bec Dauphin, as an inheritance of the Dauphins), and in 1630 by Cardinal Richelieu himself, determined to seize Monferrato and counteract the dynastic claims of Charles Emmanuel I on those lands. These are about another 70 years of French dominance, for the second time.

The strategic position of Perosa's fortifications gave them great importance during both periods of peace and war. Unfortunately, nowadays only few remains are left: a fortified village since the time of the abbots, later expanded by the Acaja family and equipped with "good and high walls" by the Savoy dukes, a significant stronghold during the second French domination, in 1696 Perosa was returned to the House of Savoy, but on the condition that its citadel be completely demolished. The same fate had befallen to the Saint John's fort in 1601, built just 4 years before on the rock called "Bec Dauphin", the ancient border between Dauphiné and the House of Savoy (the ruin we can see nowadays was part of a French redoubt).

Perosa, after returning to the House of Savoy, subjected once again French dominance in 1796, and then with the Restoration, became part of the Kingdom of Sardinia until the Unification of Italy.

== Culture ==
=== Main events ===
- The Patronal Saint Festival of St Genesius has been taking place for several years now, during the weekend of the second-to-last Sunday in August, organized by the Pro Loco in collaboration with other associations and numerous collaborators. Various events are held, including a flea market, street performances, exhibitions, and sports events (including the Goliardic Tournament of Perosa's Associations and the Bowls Tournament). Since 2016, a non-competitive 4 km long run called Perosa4Run has been introduced. In conclusion, every year the population elect the Perosino of the year.
- The Cultural Association Poggio Oddone organizes the historical reenactment Poggio Oddone Terra di Confine on the third Sunday of September every year, along with the Plaisentif Fair. This is a particular kind of cheese from the upper Chisone Valley made with milk only from cows eating a big amount of grass and violet up in the Alpin pastures. And that is why it is called "violet cheese".
- Livestock exhibition: it takes place every year on the second Monday of October. Hundreds of livestock are shown to thousands of visitors, including children from different schools of the valley. This event closes the agricultural year and it is also an important occasion for exchange and trade of livestock.
- Erbeinfiera: every year on the third Sunday of March, an herb market is set along the village streets, attracting lots of visitors and the curious.
- Meano's Festival: large crowds are attracted by this deeply felt festival that takes place in Meano's hamlet. The program includes dances, traditional dinners and themed nights
