= Bric Ghinivert =

Mountain in Italy

- Eiminàl
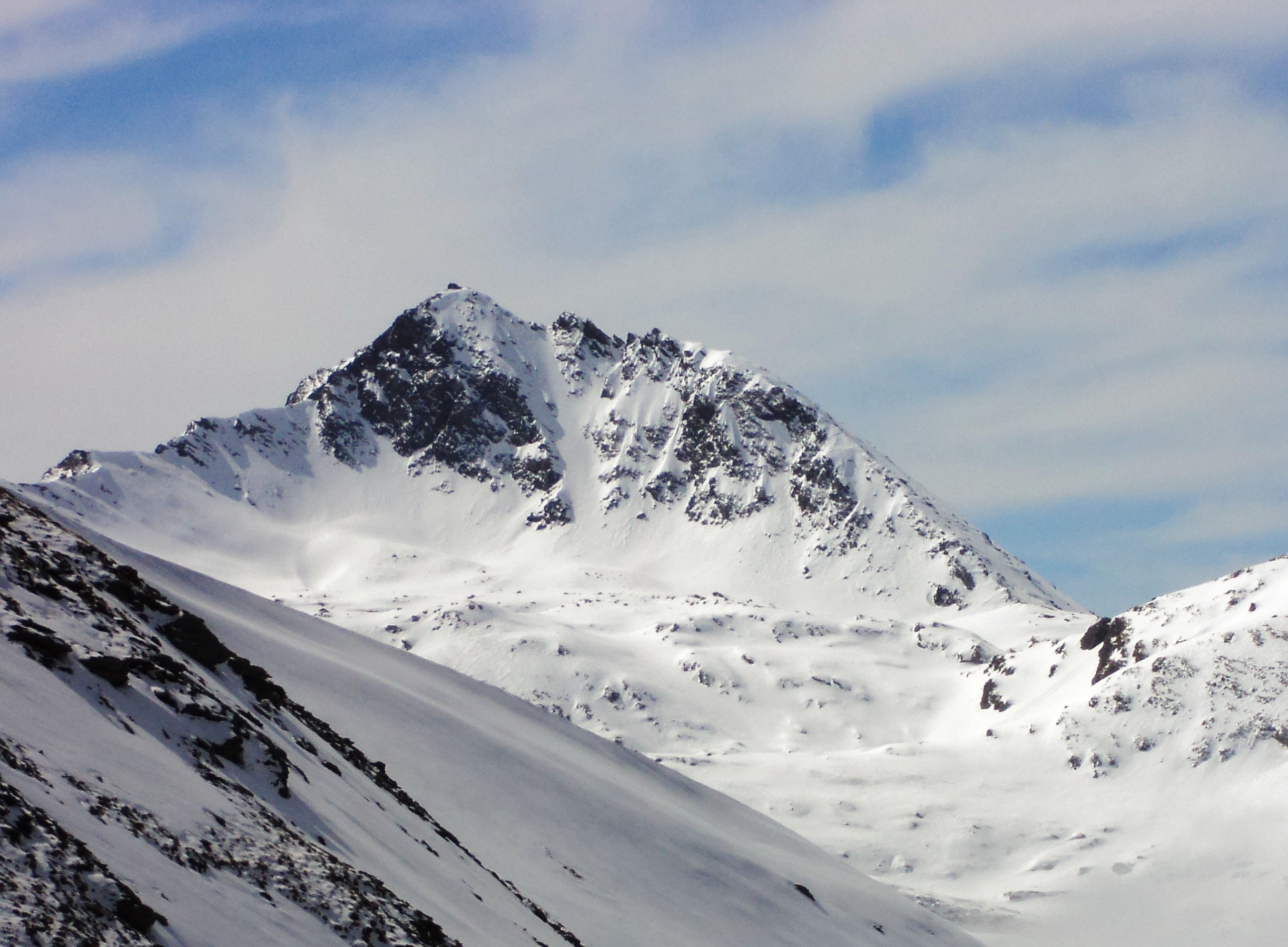

Highest point
- Elevation: 3,037 m (9,964 ft)
- Prominence: 347 m (1,138 ft)
- Isolation: 4.62 km (2.87 mi)
- Listing: Alpine mountains above 3000 m
- Coordinates: 44°57′04.77″N 06°59′27.71″E

Geography
- Location within Alps
- Location: Piedmont, Italy
- Parent range: Cottian Alps

Climbing
- Easiest route: Scrambling

Bric Ghinivert or Eiminàl (3,037 m a.s.l.) is a mountain of the Cottian Alps located in Italy.

== Geography ==
The mountain is the highest elevation of the water divide between Val Troncea (West) and Valle Germanasca (East). Following northwards the ridge Colle del Beth (Beth Pass, 2783 m a.s.l.) divides Bric Ghinivert from Bric di Mezzogiorno (2,986 m a.s.l.), while going South Colle di Ghinivert (2,831 m a.s.l.) separates it from Monte Peolioso (2,886 m a.s.l.). Administratively the mountain is on the border between Pragelato and Massello municipalities (comuni). On Bric Ghinivert top stands a summit cross.

=== SOIUSA classification ===
According to SOIUSA (International Standardized Mountain Subdivision of the Alps) the mountain can be classified in the following way:

- main part = Western Alps
- major sector = North Western Alps
- section = Cottian Alps
- subsection = Alpi del Monginevro
- supergroup = Catena Bucie-Grand Queyron-Orsiera
- group = Gruppo Queyron-Albergian-Sestrière
- subgroup = Sottogruppo Ghinivert-Albergian
- code = I/A-4.II-A.2.b

== Nature conservation ==
The western face of the mountain belongs to the Parco naturale Val Troncea.

== Access to the summit ==
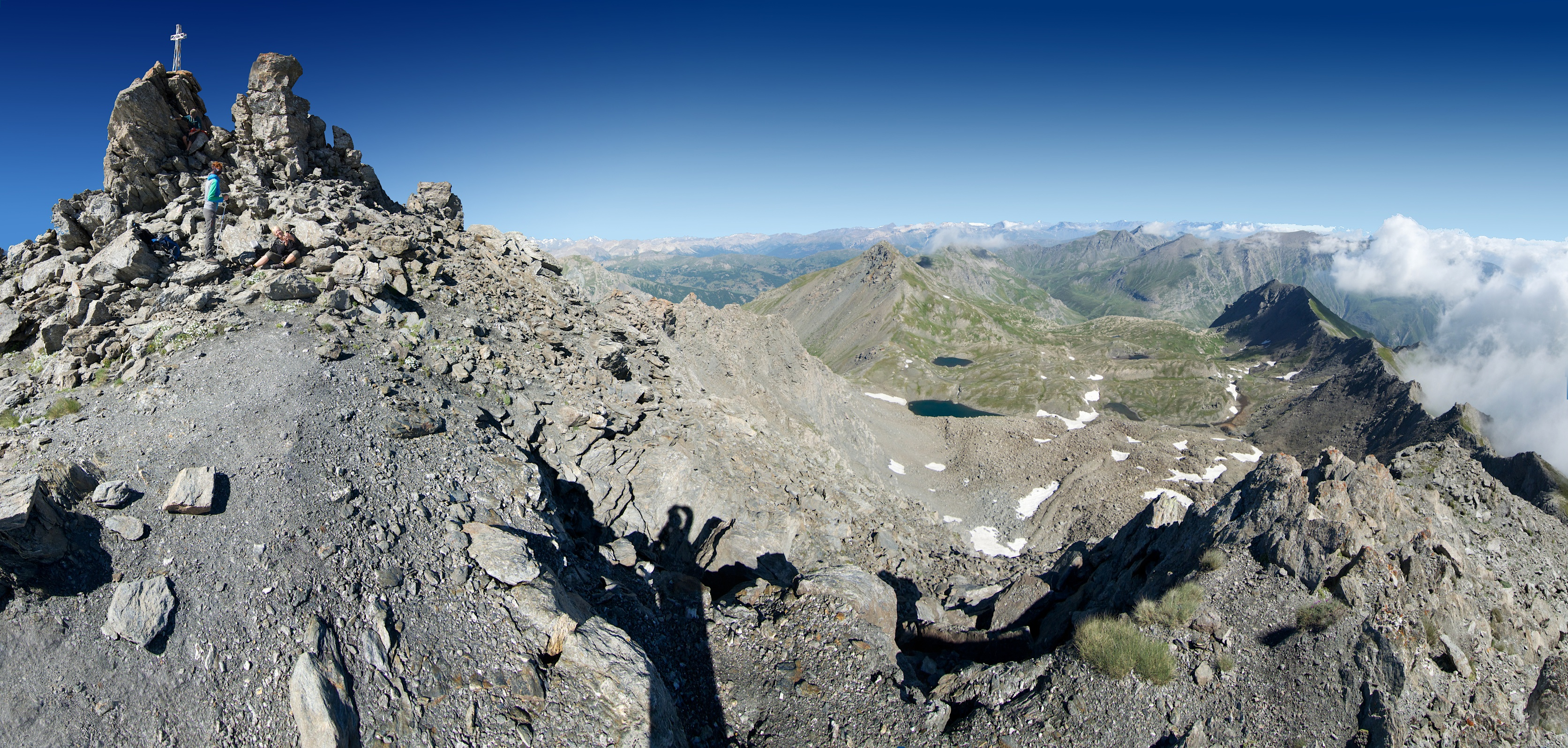
Summit of the mountain

Easy routes to Bric Ghinivert start either from Val Troncea or from Val Germanasca; in both cases they do not require alpinistic skills but some scrambling. In the Italian scale of hiking difficulty is rated EE (Escursionisti Esperti, namely suitable for expert hikers). A mountain hut managed by the nature Park is available for hikers on Colle del Beth previous arrangements with the park staff.

== History ==
Around the mountain are still identifiable remains of ancient copper mines and the connected miner's village. Aexplanatory boards created by the Nature Park outline the site history.
