= Valle Germanasca =

Valley in Turin, Piedmont, Italy

Germanasca Valley
- Val Germanasca
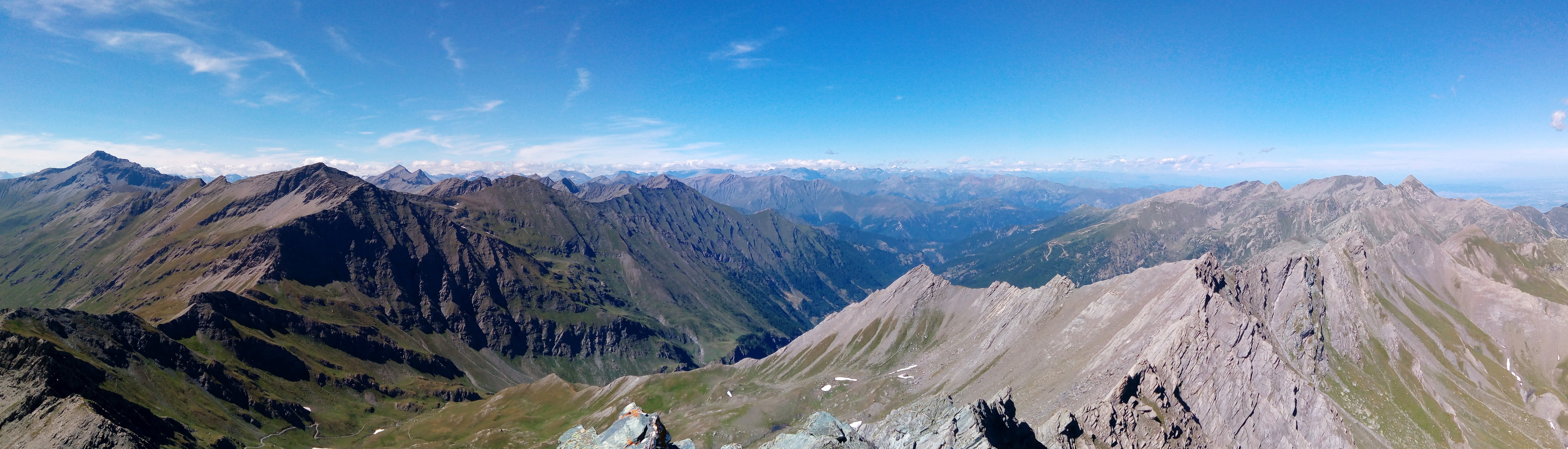
- The valley from the Bric Bucie

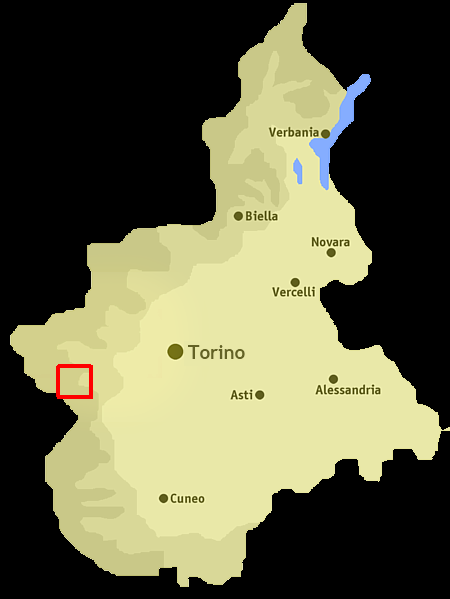
- Location of the valley in Piedmont
- Floor elevation: 600–3,060 m (1,970–10,040 ft)
- Length: 30 km (19 mi) SW–NE

Geology
- Type: River valley

Geography
- Location: Piedmont, Italy
- Coordinates: 44°56′13″N 7°07′19″E

The Valle Germanasca is a valley in the Metropolitan City of Turin, Piedmont, north-western Italy run by the Germanasca stream, a right affluent of the Chisone.

The valley, in the past affected by a strong depopulation, is now partially characterized by a tourist vocation, in particular for its landscape beauties. The main resort is Ghigo, a frazione (borough) of the comune (municipality) of Prali, famous for its ski resort. Also visited are the Talc mines of the valley, which are of its resources and are still active.

Valle Germanasca is one of the Piedmontese valleys in which the majority of the population belongs to the Waldensian Evangelical Church. It is one of the Occitan-speaking valleys of Piedmont.

== Notable summits ==
Among the summits which surround the valley (all belonging to the Cottian Alps) there are:

- Gran Queyron - 3.060 m
- Bric Ghinivert - 3.037 m
- Monte Barifreddo - 3.028 m
- Bric Rosso (or Monte Politri) - 3.026 m
- Cima Frappier - 3.003 m
- Bric Bucie - 2.998 m
- Punta Vergia - 2.990 m
- Bric di Mezzogiorno - 2.986 m
- Monte Gran Mioul - 2.974 m
- Fea Nera - 2.946 m
