= Fenestrelle =

- Comune
- Comune di Fenestrelle
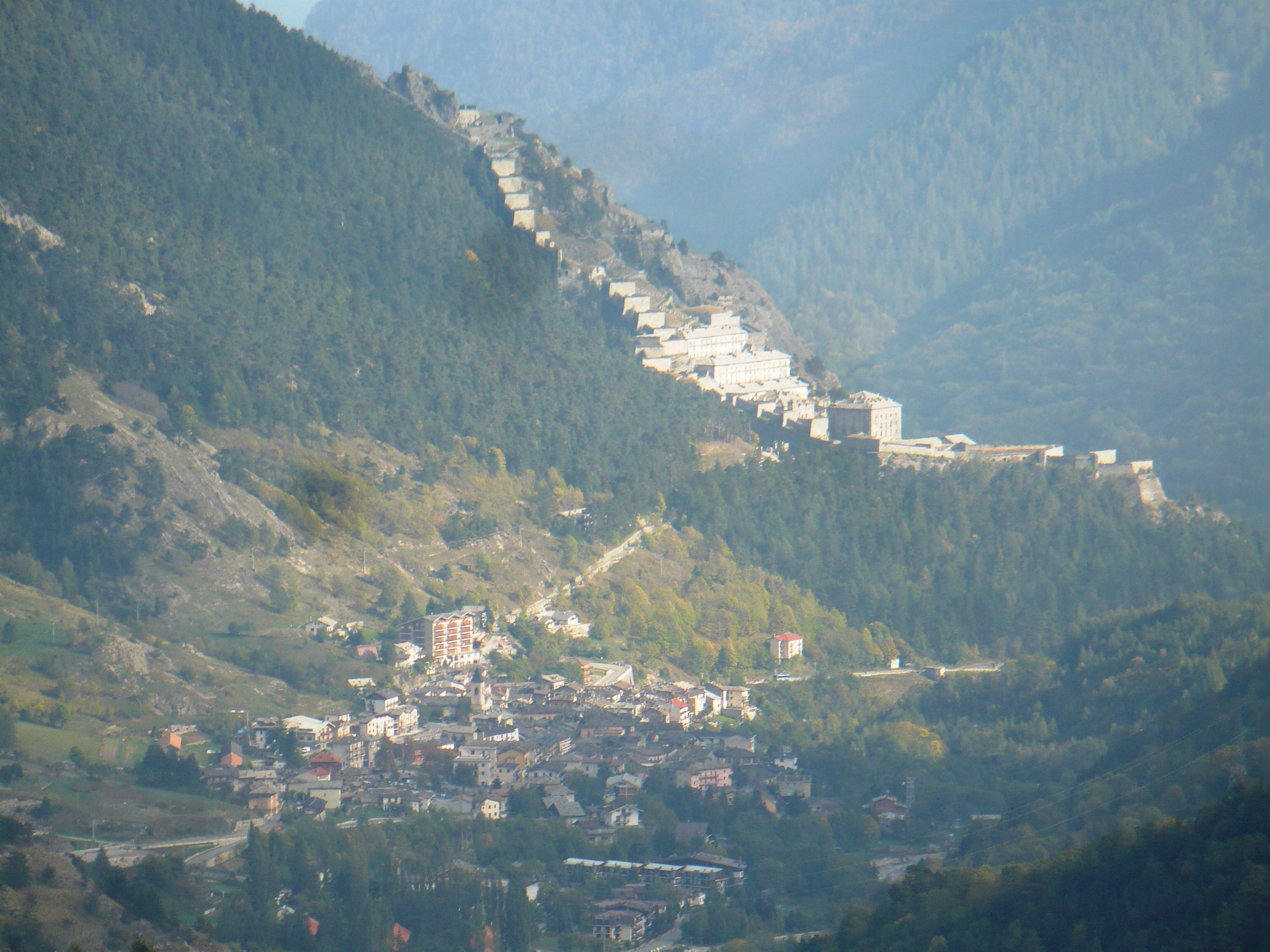

- Coat of arms

- Location within Italy Location within Piedmont
- Coordinates: 45°2′N 7°3′E
- Country: Italy
- Region: Piedmont
- Metropolitan city: Turin (TO)
- Frazioni: Champs, Puy, Pequerel, Chambons, Depot, Mentoulles, Granges, Ville Cloze, La Latta, Fondufaux

Government
  - Mayor: Michel Bouquet

Area
  - Total: 49.2 km^{2} (19.0 sq mi)
- Elevation: 1,215 m (3,986 ft)

Population (30 December 2010)
  - Total: 571
  - Density: 11.6/km^{2} (30.1/sq mi)
- Demonym: Fenestrellesi
- Time zone: UTC+1 (CET)
  - Summer (DST): UTC+2 (CEST)
- Postal code: 10060
- Dialing code: 0121
- Patron saint: St. Louis IX of France
- Saint day: 25 August
- Website: Official website

Fenestrelle (Occitan: Finistrèlas, Piedmontese: Fenestrele) is a comune (municipality) in the Metropolitan City of Turin in the Italian region Piedmont, located about 50 kilometres (31 mi) west of Turin.

It is the location of the Fenestrelle Fort, an alpine fortification which guarded the route between the Kingdom of France and the Duchy of Savoy.
