= Cottian Alps =

Mountain range on the France–Italy border

- French: Alpes Cottiennes; Italian: Alpi Cozie
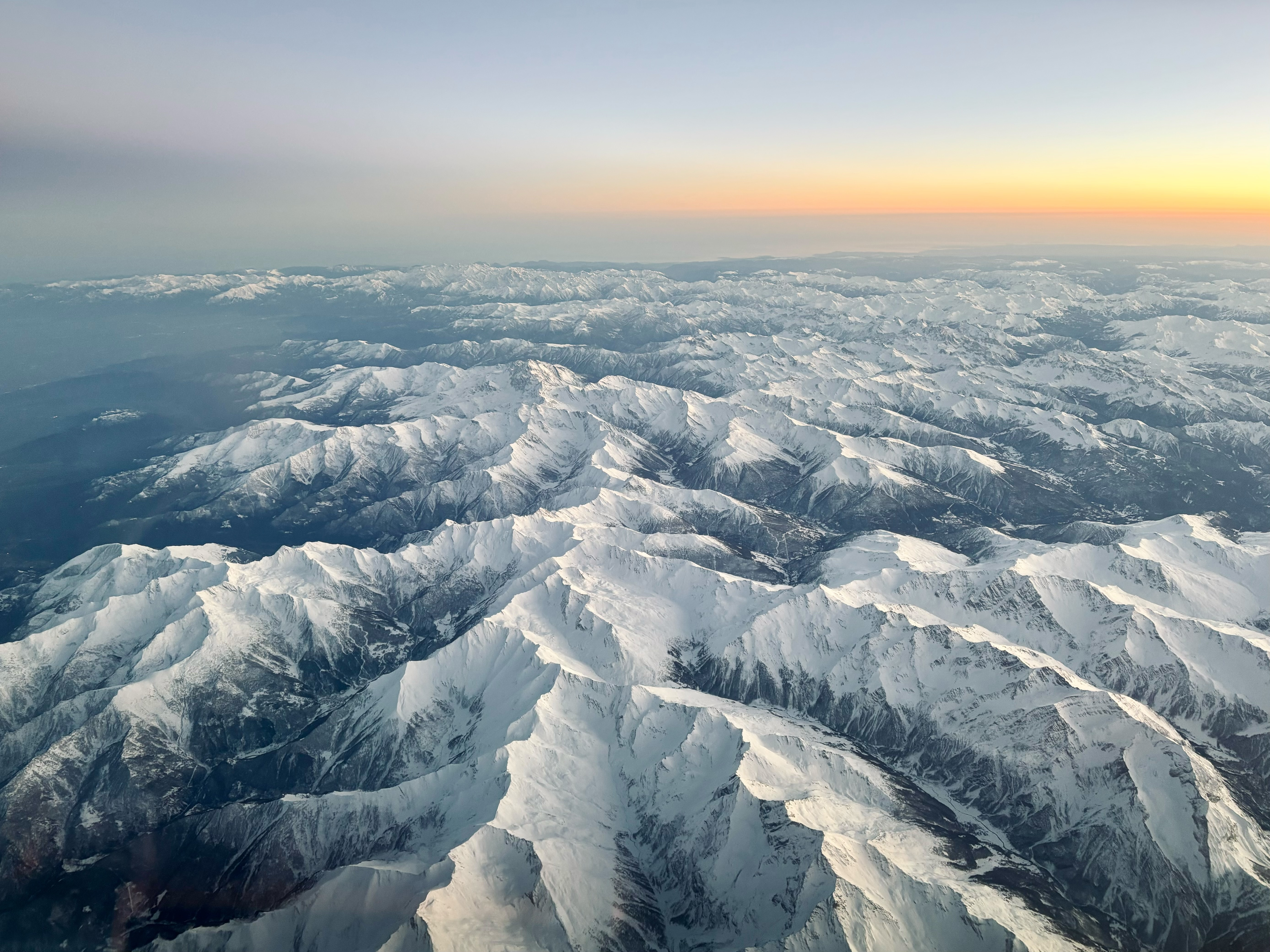
- Aerial view of the Cottian Alps

Highest point
- Peak: Monte Viso
- Elevation: 3,841 m (12,602 ft)
- Coordinates: 44°40′18″N 7°15′13″E

Geography
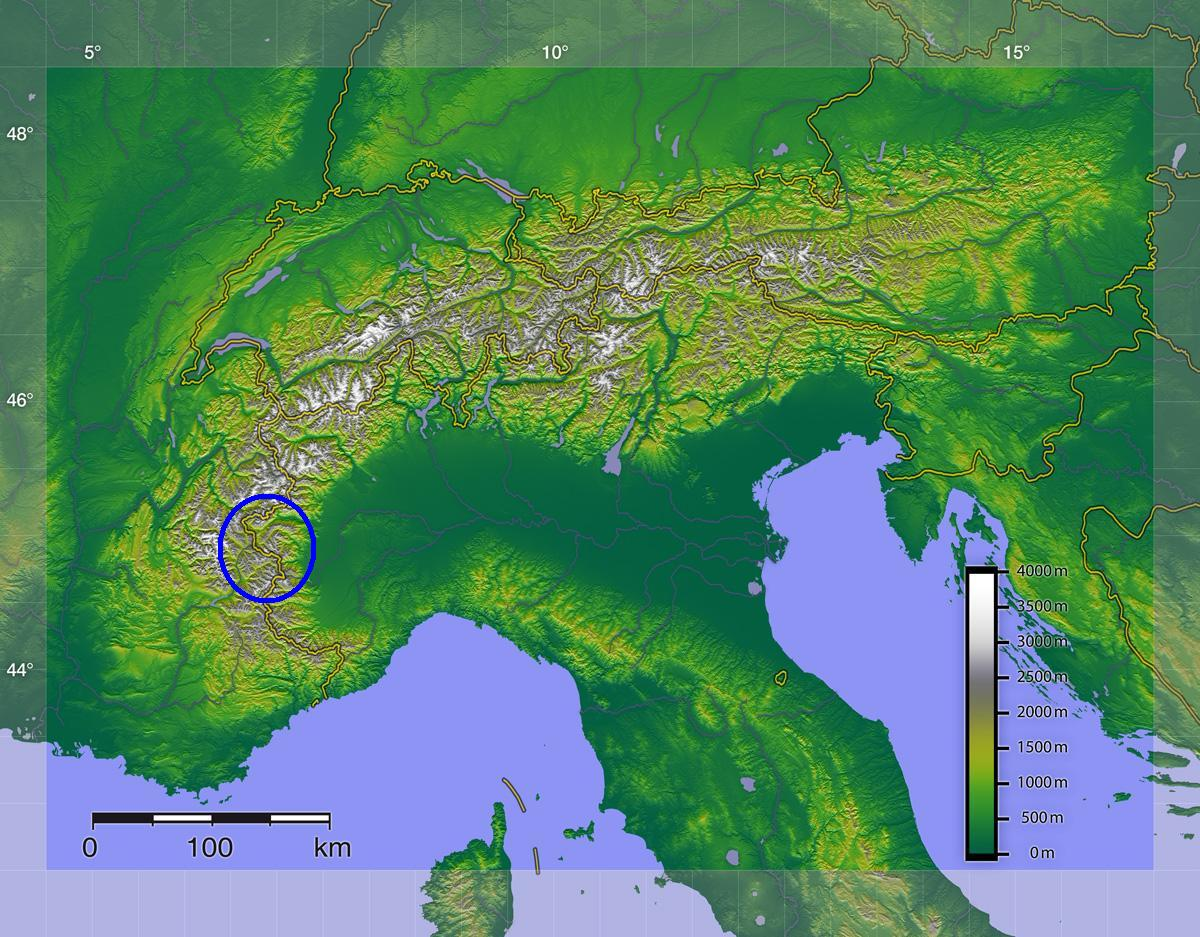
- Location
- Countries: Italy; France
- Provinces and regions: Piedmont; Auvergne-Rhône-Alpes; Provence-Alpes-Côte d'Azur
- Range coordinates: 44°45′N 7°0′E
- Parent range: Alps
- Borders on: Graian Alps; Dauphiné Alps; Provence Alps and Prealps; Maritime Alps; Po plain

Geology
- Orogeny: Alpine orogeny

The Cottian Alps (/ˈkɒtiən ˈælps/; French: Alpes Cottiennes [alp kɔtjɛn]; Italian: Alpi Cozie [ˈalpi ˈkɔttsje]) are a mountain range in the southwestern part of the Alps. They form the border between France (Hautes-Alpes and Savoie) and Italy (Piedmont). The Fréjus Road Tunnel and Fréjus Rail Tunnel between Modane and Susa are important transportation arteries between France (Lyon, Grenoble) and Italy (Turin).

== Etymology ==
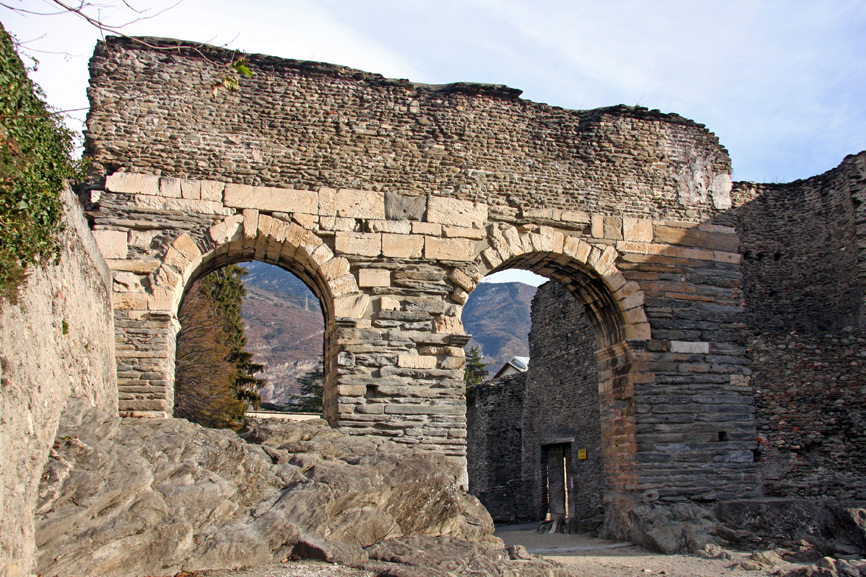
Roman aqueduct of Susa

The name Cottian comes from Marcus Julius Cottius, a king of the tribes inhabiting that mountainous region in the 1st century BC. Under his father Donnus, these tribes had previously opposed but later made peace with Julius Caesar. Cottius was succeeded by his son Gaius Julius Donnus II (reigned 3 BC − 4 AD), and his grandson Marcus Julius Cottius II (reigned 5−63 AD), who was granted the title of king by the emperor Claudius. On his death, Nero annexed his kingdom as the province of Alpes Cottiae.

== History ==
For a long part of the Middle Ages the Cottian Alps were divided between the Duchy of Savoy, which controlled their northern part and the easternmost slopes, and the Dauphiné, which at the time was independent from France. The Dauphins also held, in addition to the southwestern slopes of the range (Briançon and Queyras, now on the French side), the upper part of some of the valleys that were tributaries of the Po River (Valle di Susa, Chisone valley, Varaita Valley). The Alpine territory of Dauphiné, known as Escartons, used to have a limited autonomy and elected its own parliament. This semi-autonomous status lasted also after the annexation of the Dauphiné to France (1349), and was only abolished in 1713 due to the Treaty of Utrecht, which assigned to the House of Savoy all the mountainous area on the eastern side of the Cottian Alps.

After the treaty annexing Nice and Savoy to France, signed in Turin in March 1860 (Treaty of Turin), the north-western slopes of the range became part of the French republic.

Two eastern valleys of the Cottian Alps (Pellice and Germanasca) have been for centuries a kind of sanctuary for the Waldensians, a Christian movement that was persecuted as heretical from the 12th century onwards by the catholic church.

== Geography ==
Administratively the range is divided between the Italian province of Cuneo and the Metropolitan City of Turin (the eastern slopes), and the French departments of Savoie, Hautes-Alpes, and Alpes-de-Haute-Provence (the western slopes).

The Cottian Alps are drained by the rivers Durance and Arc and their tributaries on the French side; and by the Dora Riparia and other tributaries of the Po on the Italian side.

=== Borders ===
The borders of the Cottian Alps are (clockwise):

- the Maddalena Pass to the south, which connects the Cottian Alps with the Maritime Alps;
- the Ubayette Valley, the Ubaye Valley, the Serre-Ponçon Lake, the high Durance Valley, and the Guisane Valley to the southwest;
- the Col du Galibier to the west, which connects the Cottian Alps with the Dauphiné Alps;
- the Valloirette Valley, the Maurienne Valley, and the Chardoux Creek to the northwest;
- the Mont Cenis Pass to the north, which connects the Cottian Alps with the Graian Alps;
- Mont Cenis Lake, the Cenischia Valley, the Dora Riparia Valley, the Po Plain, and the Varaita Valley to the east.

== Peaks ==
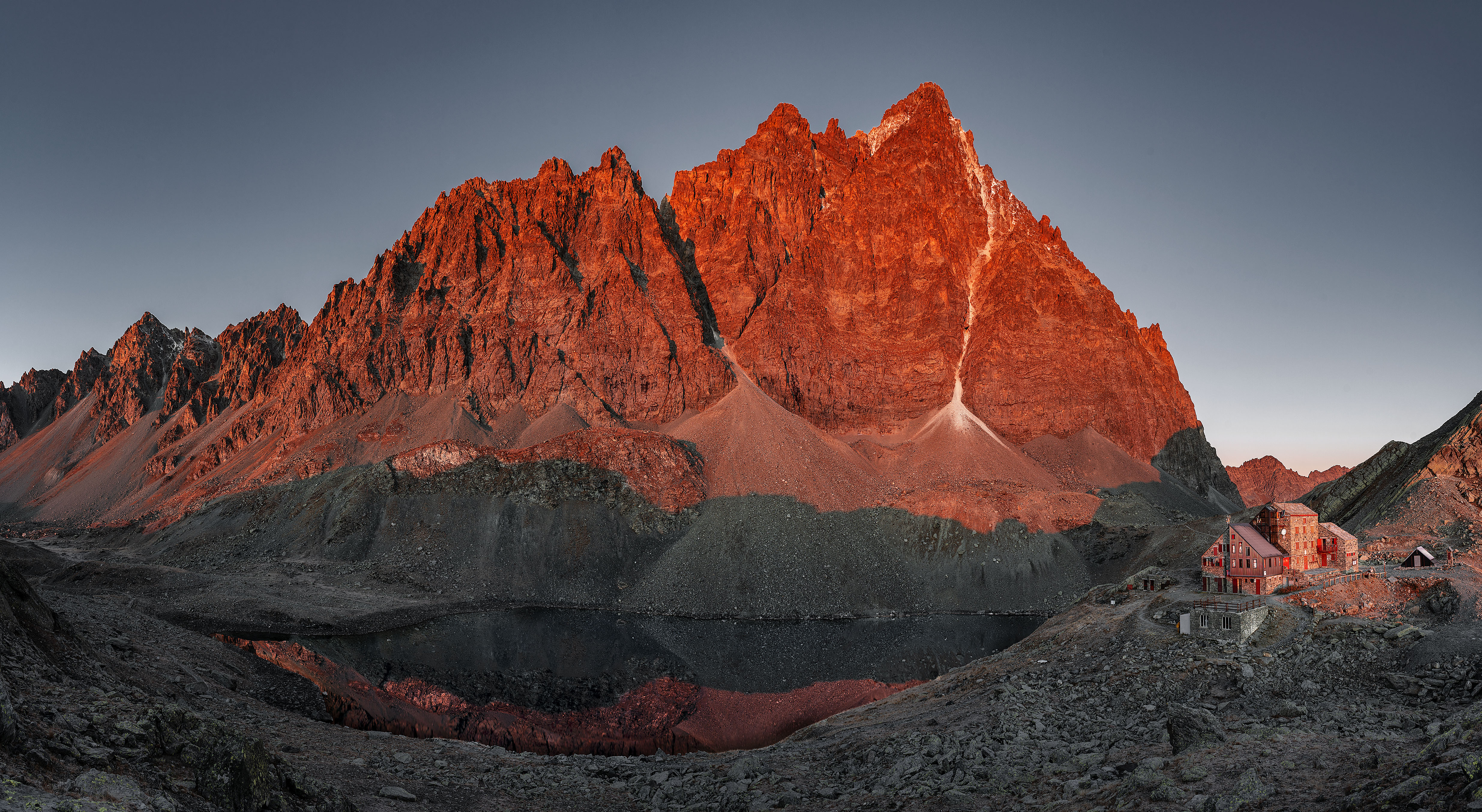
Monte Viso

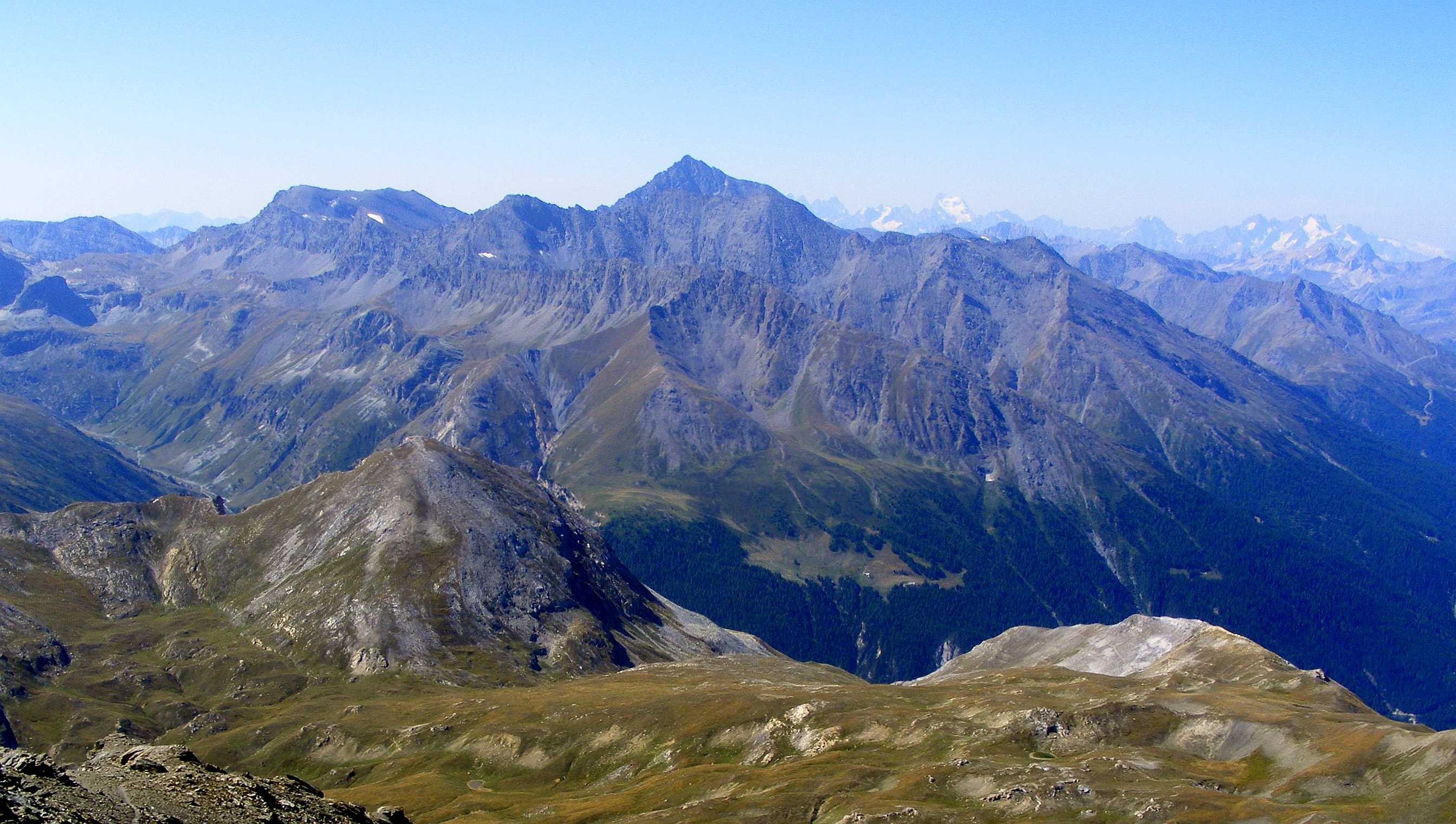
The Northern Cottian Alps from Pointe Clairy

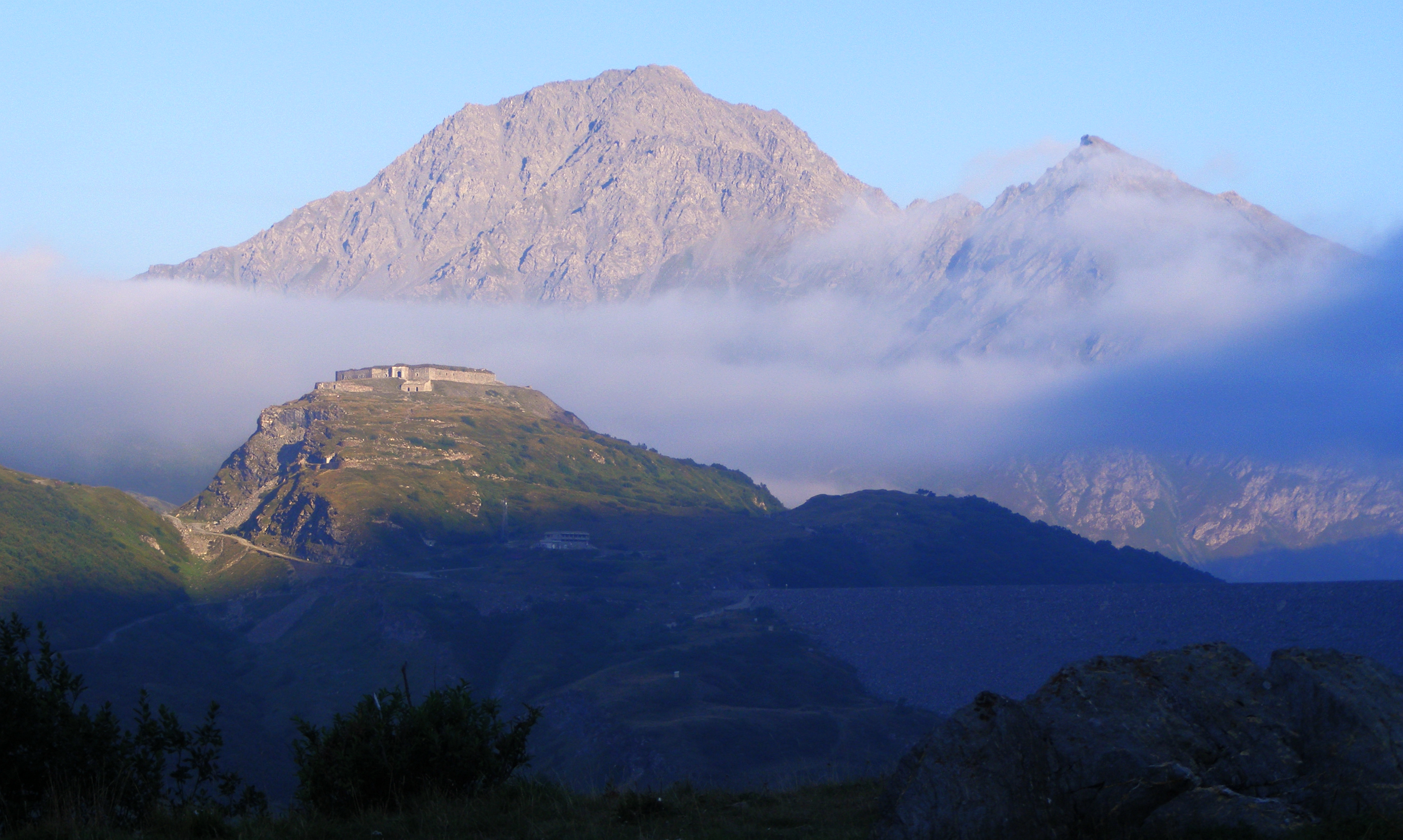
Mont Cenis in the Cottian Alps, seen from the Rocciamelone

The chief peaks of the Cottian Alps are:

name	metres	feet	name	metres	feet
Monte Viso	3841	12,609	Aiguille de Chambeyron	3412	11,155
Aiguille de Scolette	3506	11,500	Pics de la Font Sancte	3387	11,112
Brec de Chambeyron	3388	11,116	Dents d'Ambin	3382	11,096
Rognosa d'Etiache	3385	11,106	Visolotto	3353	11,001
Punta Ferrand	3364	11,037	Punta Sommeiller	3333	10,935
Bric de Rubren	3340	10,958	Bric Froid	3302	10,833
Pic de Rochebrune	3320	10,891	Rognosa di Sestriere	3280	10,761
Punta Merciantaira	3293	10,804	Roche du Grand Galibier	3242	10,637
Panestrel	3253	10,673	Rocca Bernauda	3225	10,581
Peou Roc	3231	10,601	Pointe Haute de Mary	3212	10,539
Grand Galibier	3228	10,590	Pic du Thabor	3207	10,522
Pic du Pelvat	3218	10,558	Mont Thabor	3180	10,440
Pain de Sucre	3208	10,526	Tete des Toillies	3179	10,430
Pointe des Cerces	3180	10,434	Monte Platasse	3149	10,331
Monte Granero	3170	10,401	Tête de Moïse	3110	10,204
Monte Sautron	3166	10,387			
Rocce del Rouit	3145	10,318	Punta Bagnà	3129	10,266
Mont Chaberton	3130	10,286	Pelvo d'Elva	3064	10,053
Monte Meidassa	3105	10,187	Rocca Bianca	3059	10,307
Monte Ferra	3094	10,151	Bric Ghinivert	3037	9,963
Grand Queyron	3060	10,040	Monte Politri	3026	9,928
Monte Albergian	3041	9,977	Viso Mozzo	3019	9,905
Monte Barifreddo	3028	9,933	Pointe du Fréjus	2934	9,626
Pic Caramantran	3025	9,925	Pic du Malrif	2906	9,535
Bric Bouchet	2998	9,836	Cima Ciantiplagna	2849	9,347
Monte Orsiera	2890	9,479	Mont Froid	2822	9,410
Punta Cornour	2868	9,259	Monte Friolànd	2738	8,981
Pointe de Bellecombe	2775	9,104	Monte Gimont	2646	8,681
L'Aiguille Rouge	2545	8,350	Gran Truc	2366	7,762
Pic de Morgon	2324	7,625	Monte Birrone	2131	6,991
Monte Ricordone	1764	5,787	Monte Freidour	1445	4,741

== Passes ==
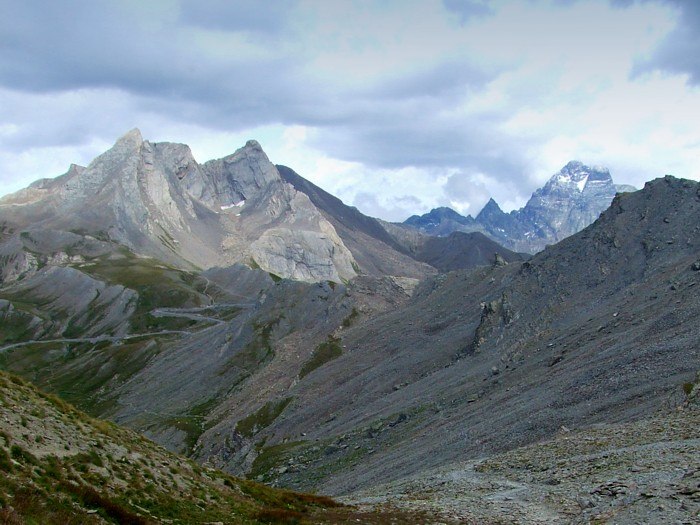
Colle d'Agnello/Col Agnel, 2,744 m

The chief passes of the Cottian Alps are:

name	location	type (as of 1911)	elevation (m/ft)
Col Sommeiller	Bardonecchia to Bramans	snow	2993/9820
Col de la Traversette	Crissolo to Abriès	bridle path	2950/9679
Col d'Ambin	Exilles to Bramans	snow	2899/9511
Col de Saint-Véran	Valle Varaita to the Queyras Valley	footpath	2844/9331
Col du Parpaillon	Ubaye Valley to the Queyras Valley	footpath	2780/9121
Col d'Étache	Bardonecchia to Bramans	bridle path	2799/9183
Col Agnel	Valle Varaita to the Queyras Valley	road	2744/9003
Col Girardin	Ubaye Valley to the Queyras Valley	bridle path	2699/8855
Col de Sautron	Valle Maira to Barcelonnette	bridle path	2689/8823
Col de Longet	Ubaye Valley to Valle Varaita	bridle path	2672/8767
Col de Mary	Ubaye Valley to Valle Maira	bridle path	2654/8708
Col d'Abriès	Perosa to Abriès	bridle path	2650/8695
Col du Fréjus	Bardonecchia to Modane	dirt road	2542/8340
Colle della Rho /Col de la Roue	Bardonecchia to Modane	dirt road/briddle path	2541/8338
Col de Clapier	Bramans to Susa	bridle path	2477/8127
Col de la Vallée Étroite	Bardonecchia to Modane	footpath	2434/7985
Col d'Izoard	Briançon to the Queyras Valley	road	2388/7835
Col de la Croix /Colle della Croce	Torre Pellice to Abriès	bridle path	2299/7541
Petit Mont Cenis	Bramans to the Mont Cenis Plateau	bridle path	2184/7166
Col de Vars	Ubaye Valley to the Queyras Valley	road	2115/6939
Mont Cenis	Lanslebourg to Susa	road	2085/6840
Colle Sestriere	Pinerolo to Cesana Torinese	road	2021/6631
Col de Larche /Maddalena Pass	Ubaye Valley to the Stura Valley	road	1991/6532
Col de Montgenèvre	Briançon to Susa	road	1854/6083
Col de l'Échelle	Briançon to Bardonecchia	road	1760/5774

== See also ==
- Alpes Cottiae (the original Roman province)
- Cottii Regnum
- Cottius
- Donnus
- Ambin group
- Monte Oronaye
- Pelvo di Ciabrera
- Punta Tre Chiosis
- Tour Jaune de Barabbas

== Maps ==
- Italian official cartography (Istituto Geografico Militare – IGM); on-line version: www.pcn.minambiente.it
- French official cartography (Institut Géographique National – IGN); on-line version: www.geoportail.fr
