= Cima Ciantiplagna =

Mountain in Italy

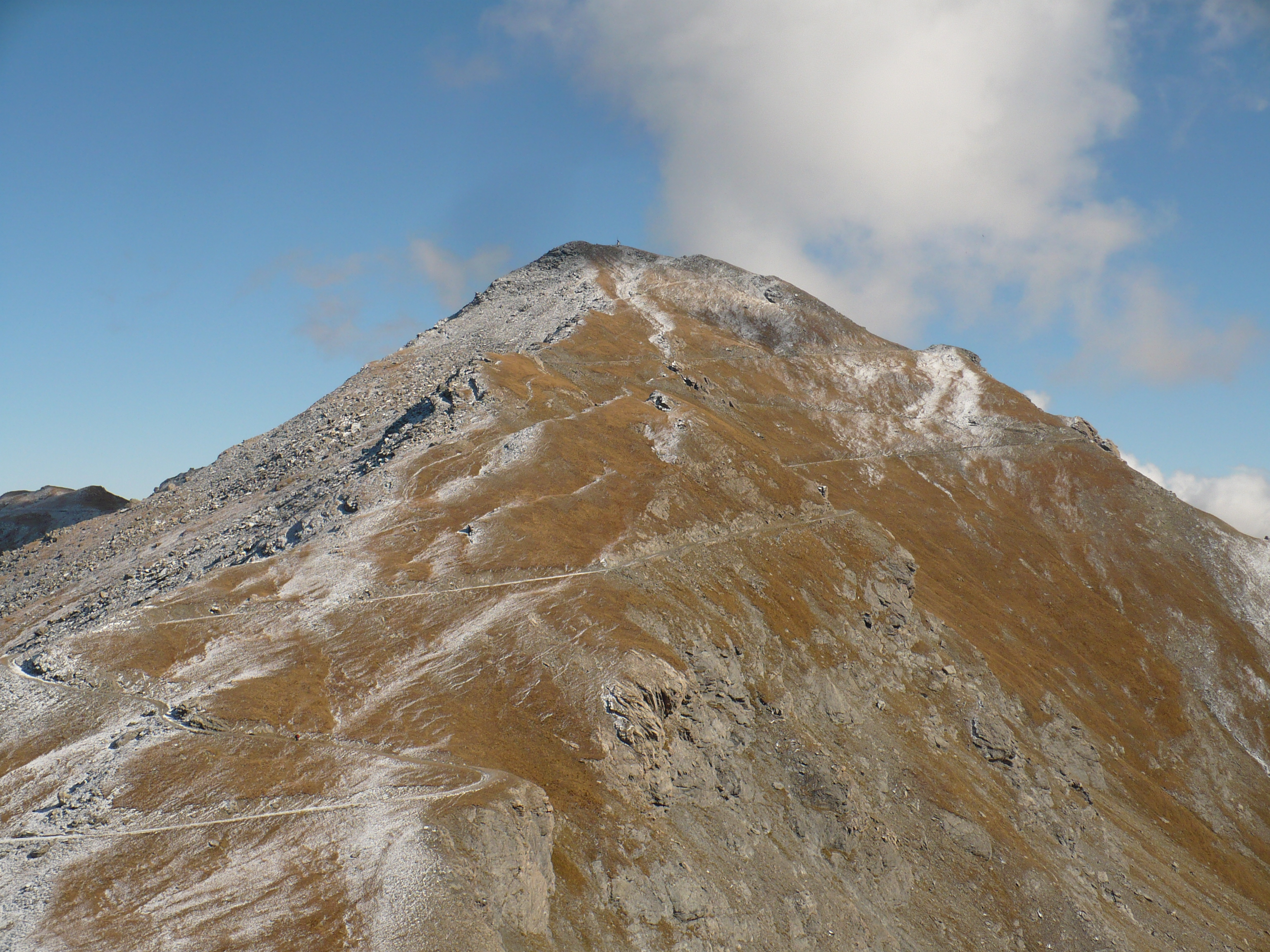
- The mountain seen from Punta delle Vallette

Highest point
- Elevation: 2,849 m (9,347 ft)
- Prominence: 679 m (2,228 ft)
- Parent peak: Monte Orsiera
- Isolation: 6.77 km (4.21 mi)
- Listing: Alpine mountains 2500-2999 m
- Coordinates: 45°04′22″N 7°01′12″E

Geography
- Location within Alps
- Location: Piedmont, Italy
- Parent range: Cottian Alps

Climbing
- Easiest route: hiking

The Cima Ciantiplagna is a mountain in the Cottian Alps belonging to the Province of Turin (Italy).

== Geography ==
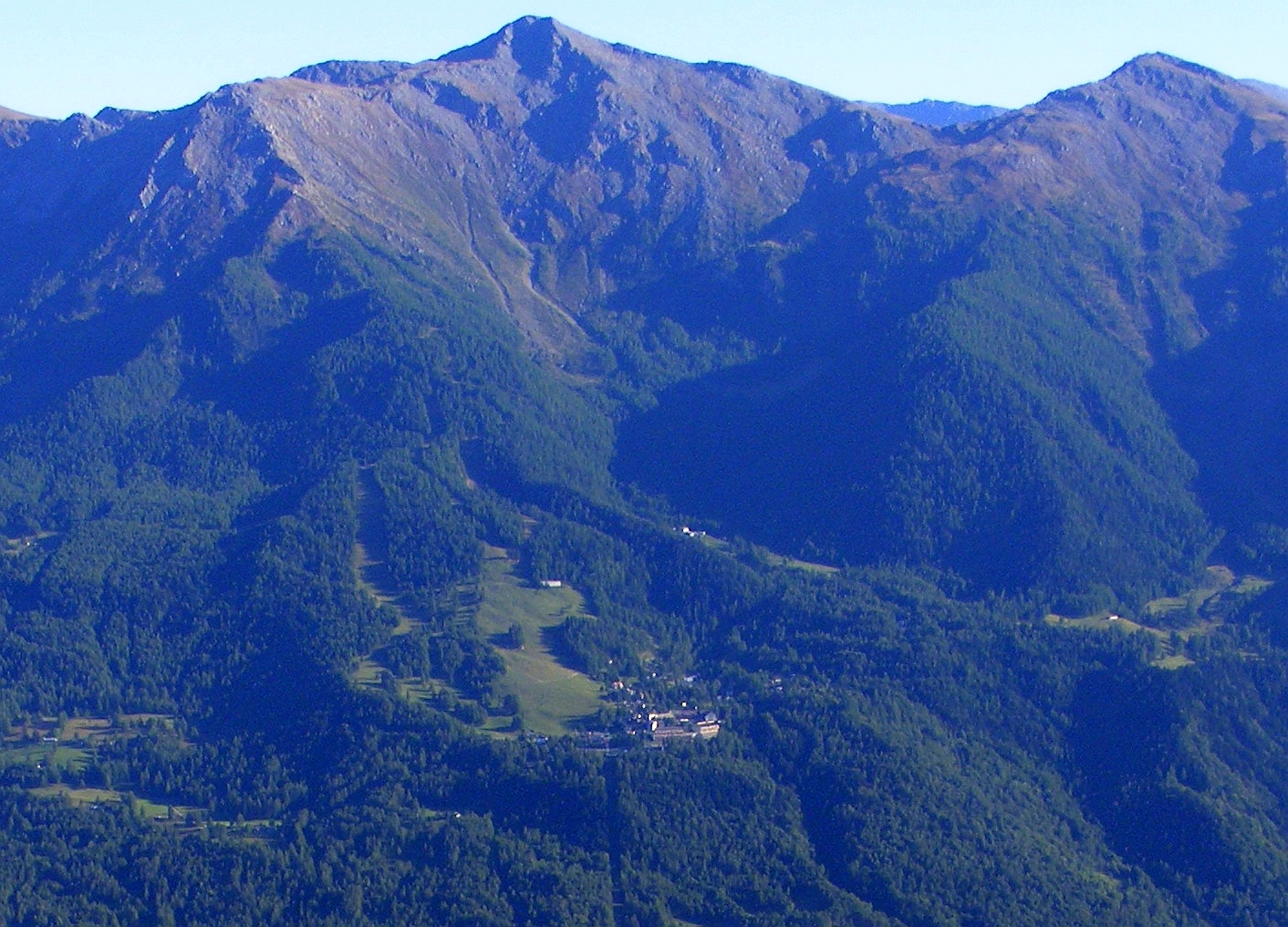
The Ciantiplagna as seen from Val Clarea, on the Susa Valley opposite side

The mountain stands on the long ridge which, starting from Sestriere, divides the Susa Valley from Chisone valley, W of the colle delle Finestre. Despite being shaped as an inconspicuous, grassy bump, it's the highest mountains of the area between Colle delle Finestre and Sestriere. Close to its summit passes an old military road built in order to deserve several military emplacements. It's a dirt road connecting Pian dell'Alpe (Usseaux) with Sestriere, open to cars and motorbikes during summertime.

=== SOIUSA classification ===
According to SOIUSA (International Standardized Mountain Subdivision of the Alps) the mountain can be classified in the following way:

- main part = Western Alps
- major sector = North Western Alps
- section = Cottian Alps
- subsection = Central Cottian Alps ((in Italian) Alpi del Monginevro)
- supergroup = Catena Bucie-Grand Queyron-Orsiera
- group = Gruppo dell'Orsiera
- subgroup = Costiera Orsiera-Rocciavrè
- code = I/A-4.II-A.3.b

== Access to the summit ==
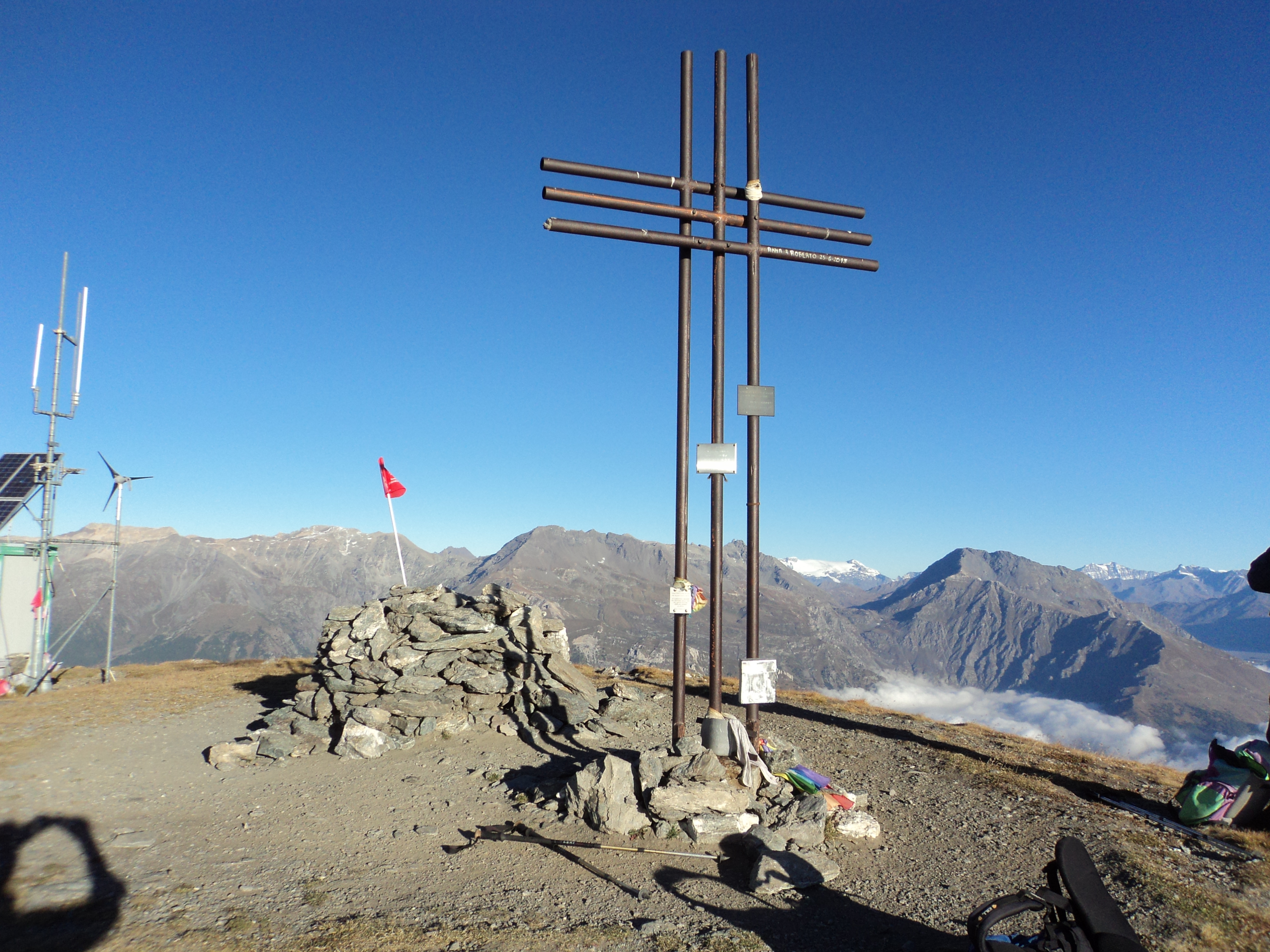
Summit cross

The summit of the Ciantiplagna is easy to reach, and the normal route starts from the old military road linking Sestriere with Colle delle Finestre and briefly follows the NE ridge of the mountain up to its top, marked by a metallic summit cross. It also can be attained by mountain bike. Besides summer hiking the Ciantiplagna is also a popular ski mountaineering destination.

== Nature conservation ==
The mountain and its surrounding area are included in a regional nature park called Parco naturale Orsiera - Rocciavrè, which also is the SIC (Site of Community Importance) of code IT1110006.

== Maps ==
- Italian official cartography (Istituto Geografico Militare - IGM); on-line version: www.pcn.minambiente.it
- Istituto Geografico Centrale - Carta dei sentieri e dei rifugi scala 1:50.000 n. 1 Valli di Susa Chisone e Germanasca
