= Tour Jaune de Barabbas =

Rocky pinnacle in the Cottian Alps, Italy

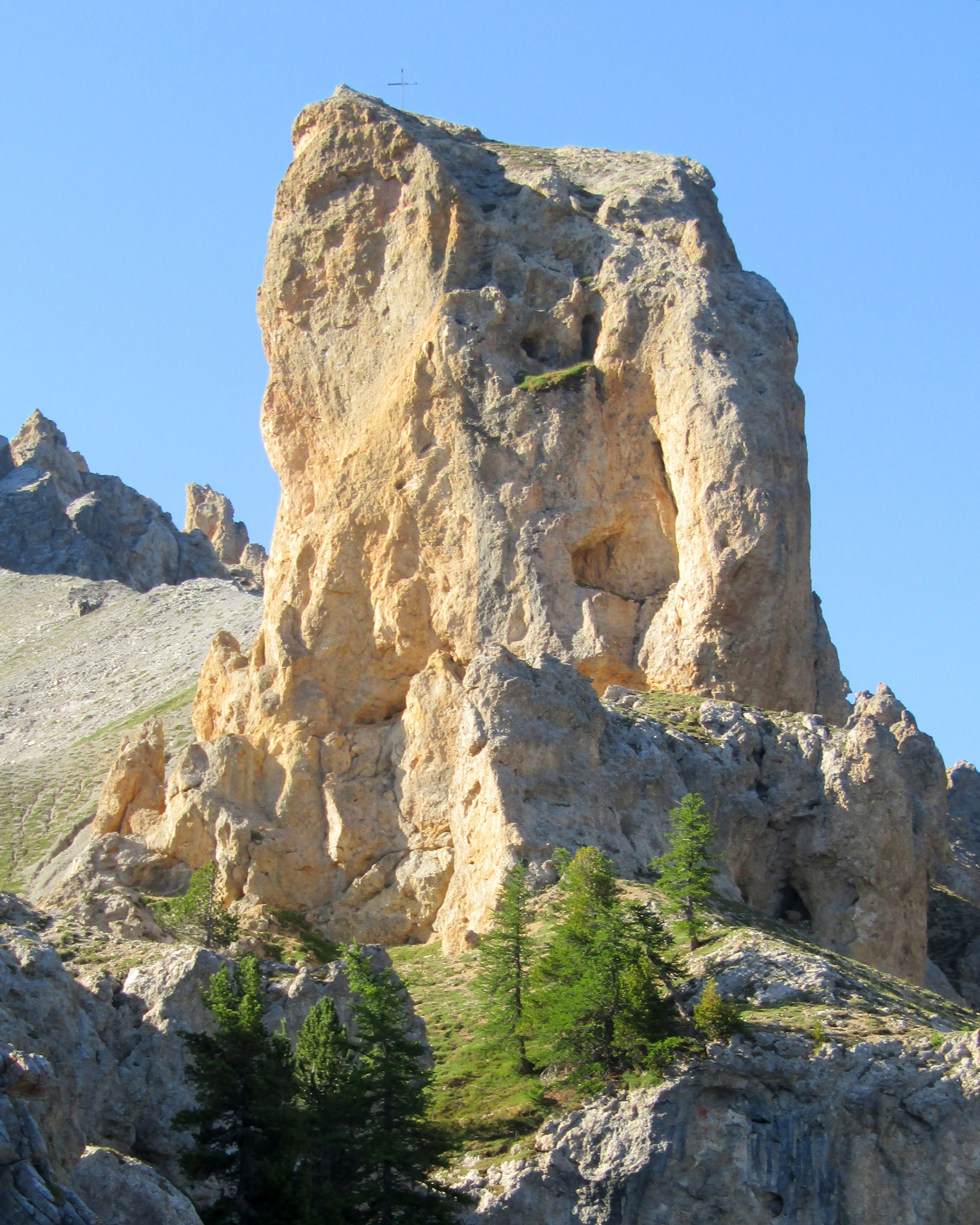
- South face

Highest point
- Coordinates: 45°01′40″N 6°40′54″E

Geography
- Location within Italy
- State: Piedmont
- Parent range: Cottian Alps

Climbing
- First ascent: 5 August 1907

The Tour Jaune de Barabbas (2,365 meters above sea level) is a rocky pinnacle in the Cottian Alps.

== Toponym ==
The rock we call the Tour Jaune de Barabbas is an isolated rock, without a local name, located on the ridge descending north from the Rocher de Barabbas, the Guglia of the Italian Mezzodì

— M.R.Touchon, Tour Jaune de Barabbas, ed. C.A.F.

The name Tour Jaune de Barabbas, which in French means Yellow Tower of Barabbas, was given to the rocky pinnacle by its first climbers. Not adopted by the traditional IGM cartography, which leaves it unnamed and lists its elevation as 2,373 m a.s.l., the name is instead used in mountaineering literature and recent hiking maps. It derives from the yellowish color of the rock composing the pinnacle and the French name of the nearby Guglia del Mezzodì, namely Rocher de Barabbas. The reference to Barabbas, a figure from the Gospels, echoes the toponyms of other mountains in the Valle Stretta, such as Mont Thabor and the Three Wise Men (Punta Gasparre, Punta Melchiorre, and Punta Baldassarre), attributed to the devotion of medieval pilgrims.

== Characteristics ==
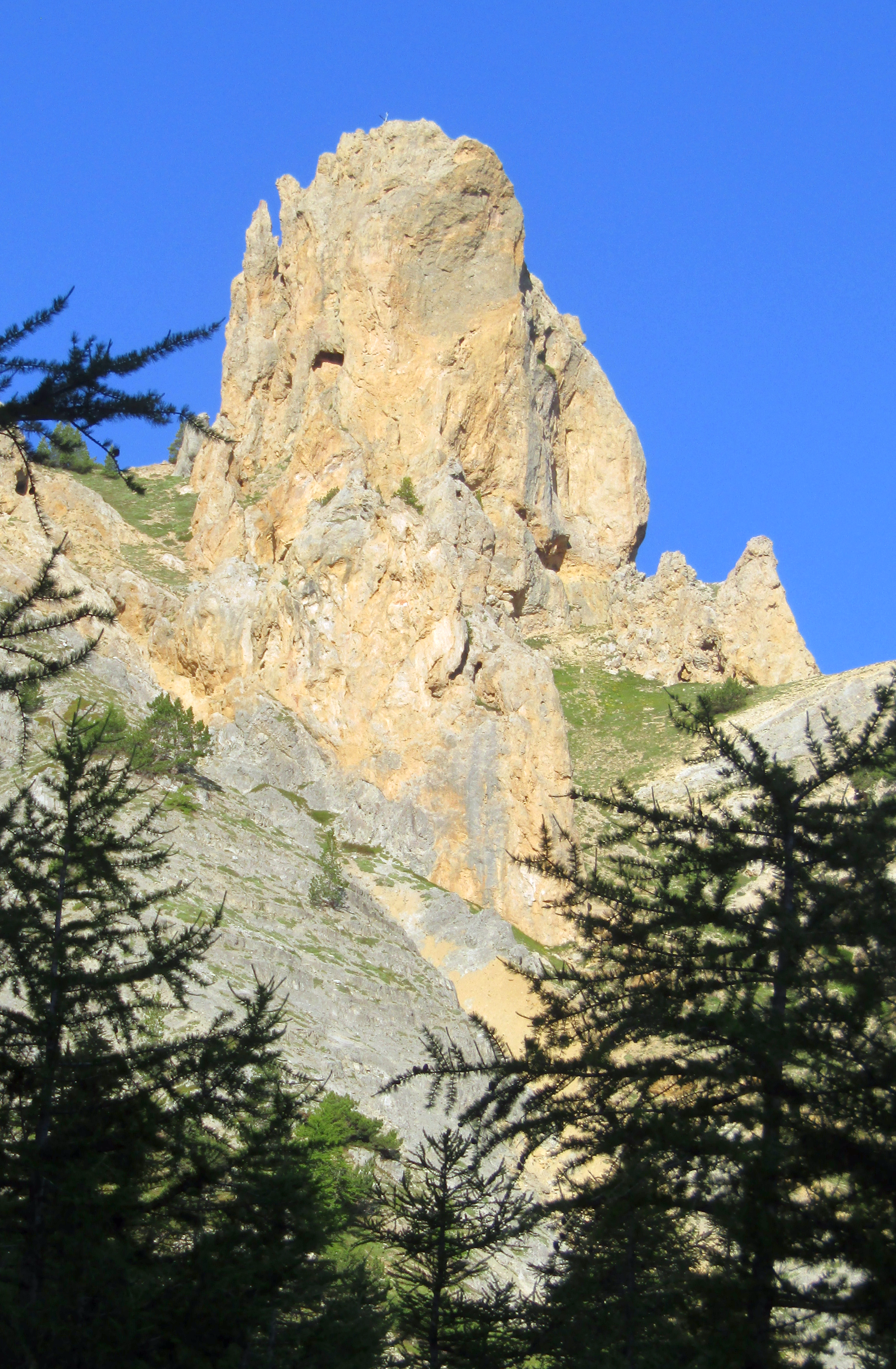
View from the Guiaud Valley

The rock formation is located in the municipality of Bardonecchia (TO), close to the border with France. It represents the main elevation of the ridge that, branching off from the main Alpine ridge at the Guglia del Mezzodì (2,621 m a.s.l.), separates the Guiaud stream valley (to the east) from the Comba della Gorgia, both tributaries of the Valle Stretta stream. It rises about fifty meters above the ridge. At the base of the tower, there are several small caves, one of which contains a Marian statue called Notre-Dame du Midì.

== History ==
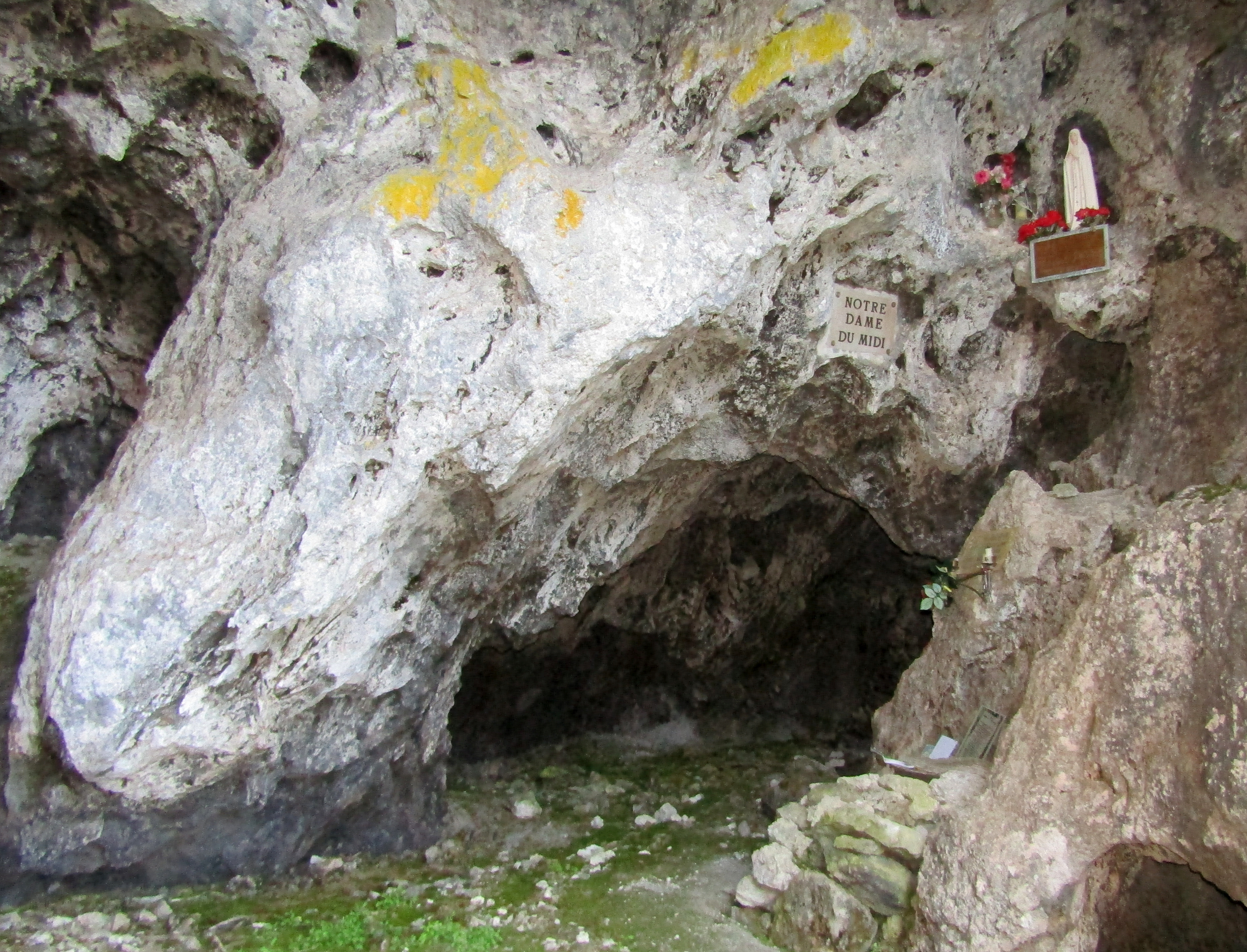
The small cave with the Madonna statue

The summit of the Tour Jaune de Barabbas was first reached on 5 August 1907 by French climbers L.Noel and R.Touchon via the southeast face. The two reached the summit twice; on the first ascent, on 7 August 1907, they built a cairn, while during the second ascent, they placed a summit cross. The first winter ascent was made by Armando Biancardi and Gigi Panei, who reached the summit on 21 March 1949 via the west face. In preparation for the hostilities of World War II, the area surrounding the mountain was involved in the construction of the Alpine Wall fortifications, some remains of which are still clearly visible.

== Ascent to the summit ==
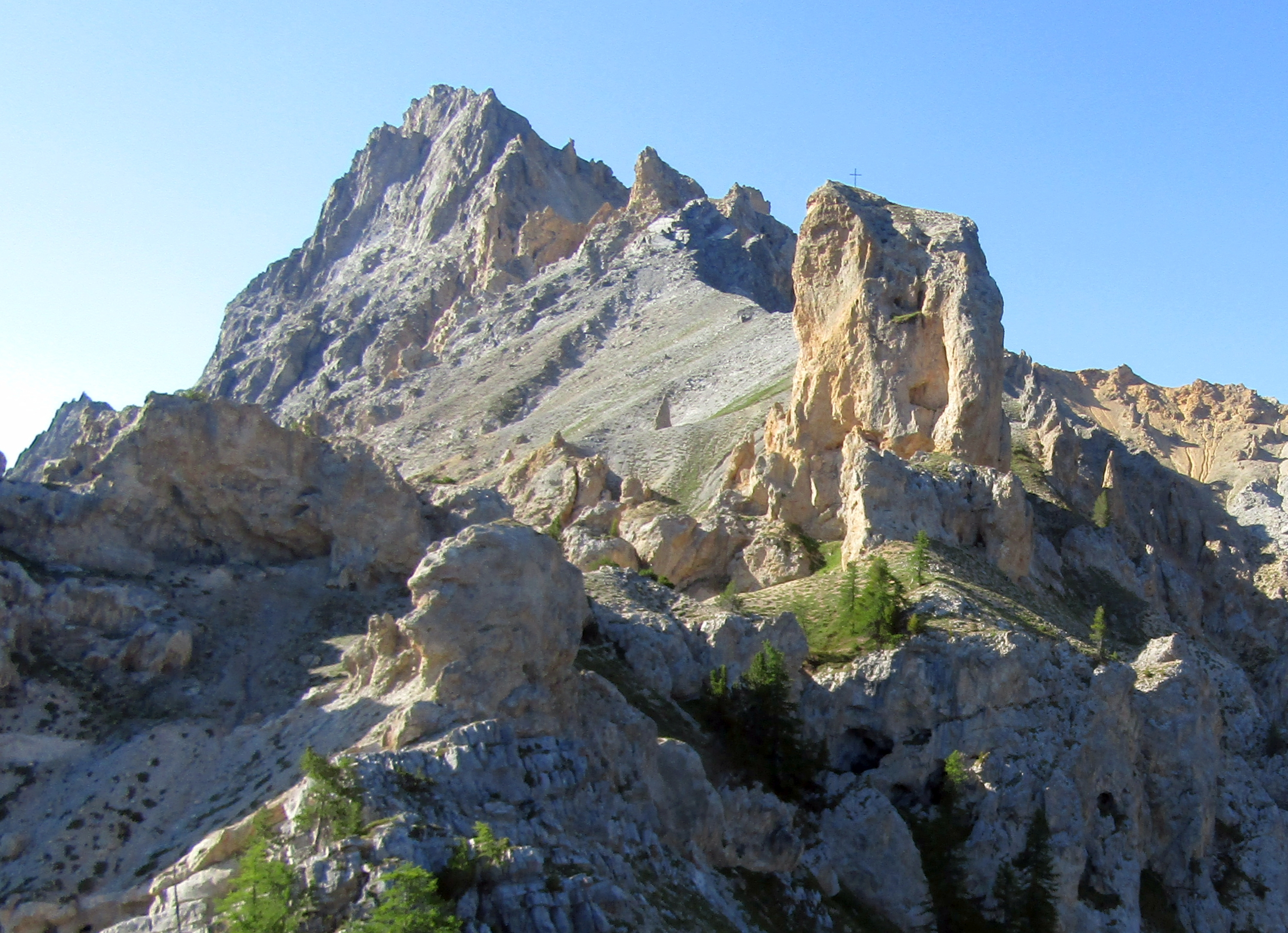
The pinnacle and, to the left, the Guglia del Mezzodì

The normal route to the summit of the pinnacle is considered to have a climbing difficulty grade of PD, while the more challenging west face reaches grade D. The base of the tower is accessible by trail from the Col de l'Échelle or, with a greater elevation gain, from Pian del Colle. In the latter case, it is possible to complete a loop by ascending through the Guiaud Valley and descending initially through the Comba della Gorgia, then returning to the Guiaud Valley.

== Bibliography ==
- Aruga, Roberto; Losana, Pietro; Re, Alberto (1985). Alpi Cozie Settentrionali [Northern Cottian Alps]. Guida dei Monti d'Italia (in Italian). Vol. 6. San Donato Milanese: CAI e TCI.

Maps

- Cartografia ufficiale italiana in scala 1:25.000 e 1:100.000 [Official Italian cartography at scales 1:25,000 and 1:100,000] (in Italian). Istituto Geografico Militare.
- Alta Valle Susa (scala 1:25.000) [Upper Susa Valley (scale 1:25,000)] (in Italian). Ciriè: Fraternali editore. 2015. ISBN 9788897465225.
- Carta dei sentieri e dei rifugi scala 1:50.000 - Valli di Susa Chisone e Germanasca [Trail and refuge map scale 1:50,000 - Susa, Chisone, and Germanasca Valleys] (in Italian). Turin: Istituto Geografico Centrale.
- Cartografia ufficiale francese in scala 1:25.000 [Official French cartography at scale 1:25,000] (in French). Institut géographique national (IGN).
