= Monte Sautron =

Mountain in the Cozie Alps on the Italy-France border

- Tête de Sautron
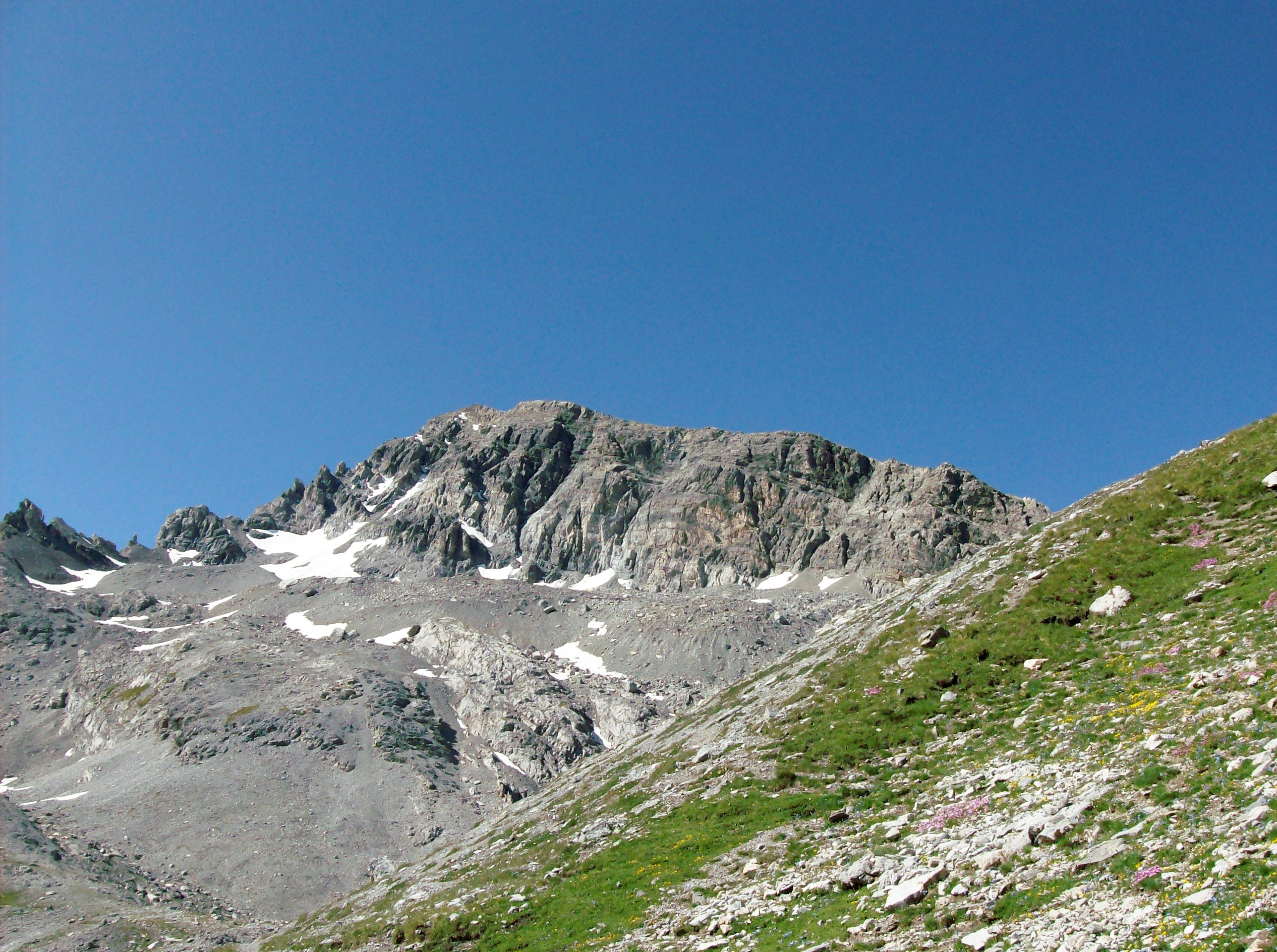
- The western slope of Monte Sautron

Highest point
- Coordinates: 44.488078°N 6.877117°E

Geography
- Countries: Italy; France
- Region(s): Piedmont; Provence-Alpes-Côte d'Azur
- Parent range: Alps

Climbing
- First ascent: 1877

The Monte Sautron (3,166 m) is a mountain of the Cottian Alps, located between the Italian Valle Maira and the French Ubaye Valley.

== Characteristics ==
The mountain rises on the main Alpine watershed, at a node where several secondary ridges branch off. The summit lies on the Italy-France border and is shared between the Italian municipality of Acceglio and the French municipality of Larche.

The main Alpine ridge arrives from the northwest, from the Colle della Portiola, and ascends to the summit; here it turns south, descending toward Monte Vallonasso, where it bends southwest again to reach the Colle del Sautron. From the summit, a secondary ridge branches off in a roughly northeast direction, descending to the pass known as La Forcellina, and continues toward the Cima di Stroppia, where it turns north, forming the Rocca Bianca group. Another ridge branches from the summit northward, sloping down toward the Val di Stroppia, which descends from the Colle della Portiola toward the Valle Maira. The French slope features a less pronounced rib descending east-southeast toward the head of the Vallon de Viraysse.

The mountain’s elevation is reported differently in national cartographies: the Italian IGM cartography indicates an elevation of 3,166 m, while the French IGN cartography indicates 3,155 m.

From a geological perspective, the mountain consists of a relatively homogeneous mass of dolomitic limestones and dolomites from the Triassic, belonging to the Briançonnais zone; to the north, carbonaceous schists, calcareous argillites, and dolomitic breccias, also Triassic, belonging to the same complex, emerge. This formation rests on a base of calcschists from the Late Cretaceous - Eocene, outcropping at the base on the French slope.

The French name, Tête de Sautron, reflects the toponym Sautron. This toponym is of Occitan origin; one tradition suggests it recalls the many emigrant Piedmontese who died in this area while attempting to cross the Alps to work in France.

== Ascent to the summit ==
=== First ascent ===
The first known ascent is attributed to Pio Paganini, an engineer of the Istituto Geografico Militare, who reached the summit in 1877.

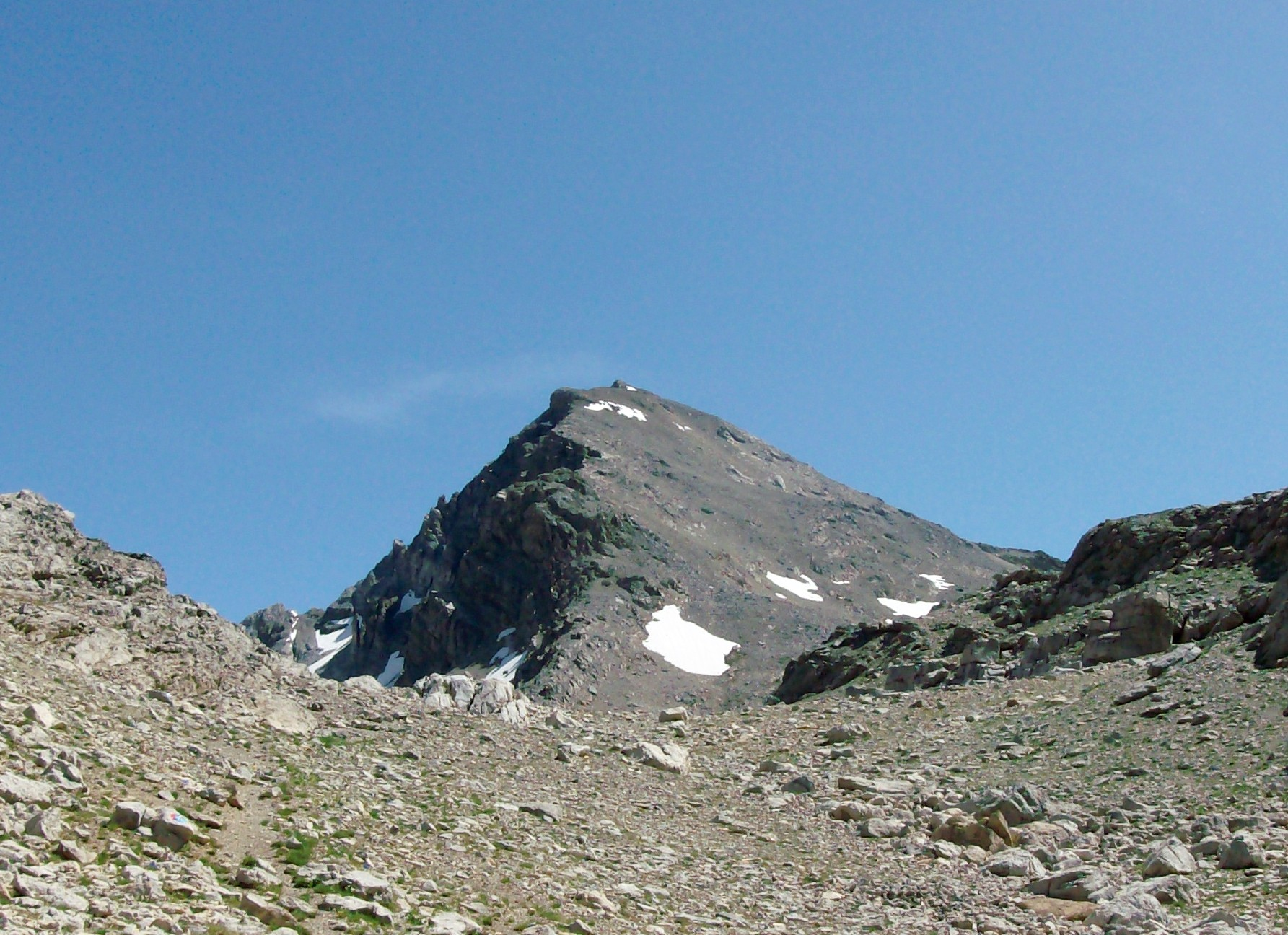
The northern ridge and northwestern slope, along which the normal route develops

=== Normal route ===
The normal route follows the secondary ridge that branches from the summit northward. From the Italian side, the ridge is reached starting from the hamlet Chiappera of Acceglio; one ascends to the Montagna di Stroppia following the Dino Icardi Trail, then turns left following signs for the Colle della Portiola, partially along the Roberto Cavallero Trail. Upon reaching the end of the northern ridge, one begins to ascend it, initially keeping slightly to the right, until reaching the summit cross. The trail along the ridge is partially marked with red blazes. The route is of a hiking type, with a difficulty rated EE on the Italian scale.

An alternative route involves reaching the Colle della Portiola and from there ascending to the summit via the northwest ridge. For the ascent, one can rely on the Rifugio Stroppia and the Bivacco Barenghi in Valle Maira; somewhat farther away are the Rifugio Campo Base in Chiappera of Acceglio, and the Rifugio Chambeyron in the Vallon de Chambeyron in France.

=== Winter access ===
In the winter season, the ascent to the summit becomes a ski mountaineering route. The most convenient approach is from Larche, ascending to the summit via the ridge from the Colle della Portiola.

== Bibliography ==
- Official Italian cartography of the Istituto Geografico Militare (IGM) at scales 1:25,000 and 1:100,000, available online
- Official French cartography of the Institut géographique national (IGN), available online
- Territorial Information System of the Province of Cuneo, based on 1:10,000 cartography
- Istituto Geografico Centrale - Trail map 1:50,000 no. 6 "Monviso" and no. 7 "Valli Maira-Grana-Stura"
- Province of Cuneo - Valle Maira Mountain Community: Trail map scale 1:25,000 Valle Maira
