= Punta Cornour =

Mountain in Italy

- Punta Cournour
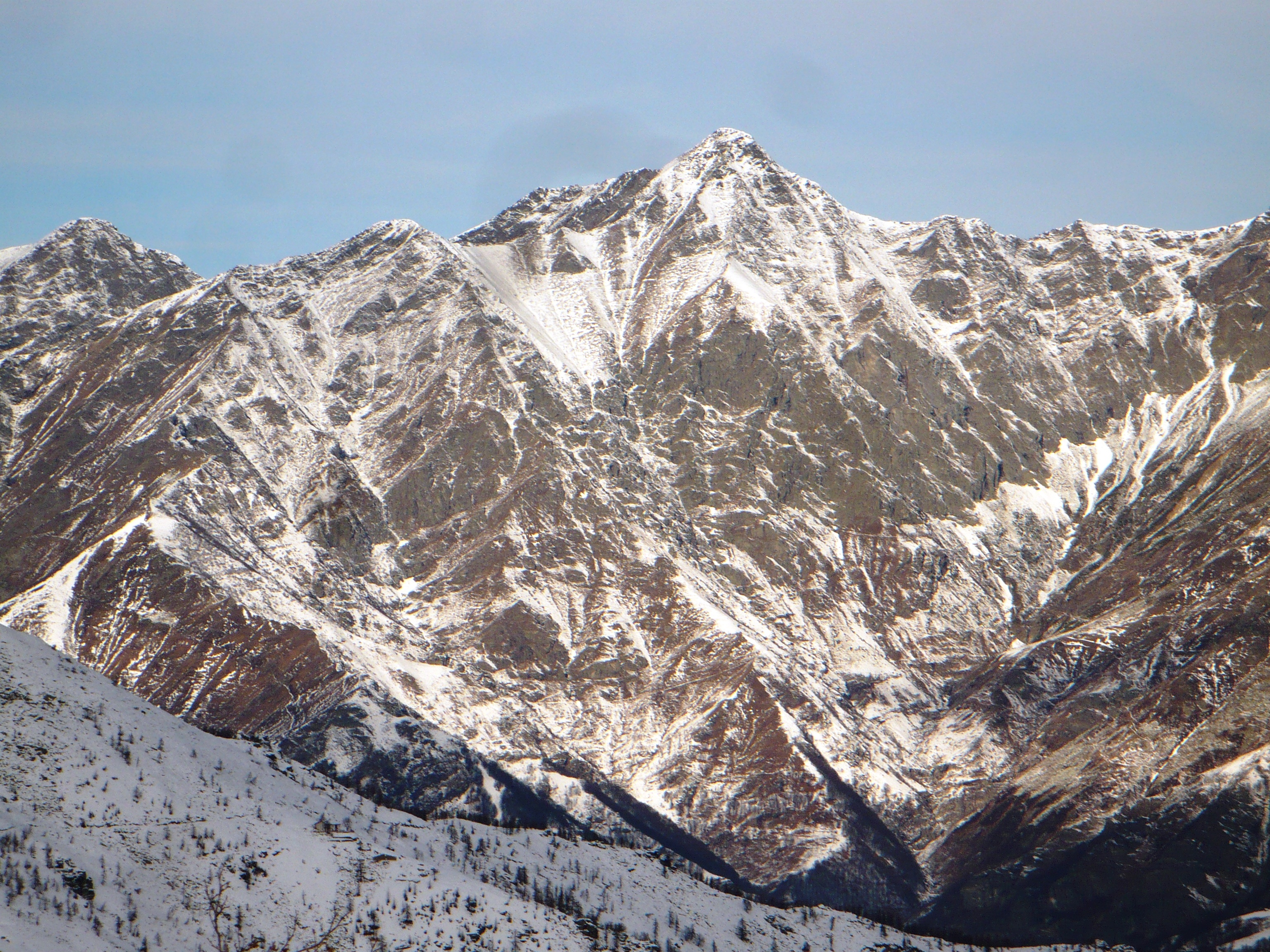
- Late autumn view

Highest point
- Elevation: 2,868 m (9,409 ft)
- Prominence: 418 m (1,371 ft)
- Isolation: 5.6 km (3.5 mi)
- Listing: Alpine mountains 2500-2999 m
- Coordinates: 44°51′01″N 7°05′33″E

Geography
- Location within Alps
- Location: Piemonte, Italy
- Parent range: Cottian Alps

Climbing
- First ascent: 1836, Captain Cossato of the Royal Sardinian Army
- Easiest route: Hike with some scabbling

The Punta Cornour is a 2,868 metres high mountain on the Italian side of the Cottian Alps.

== Toponymy ==
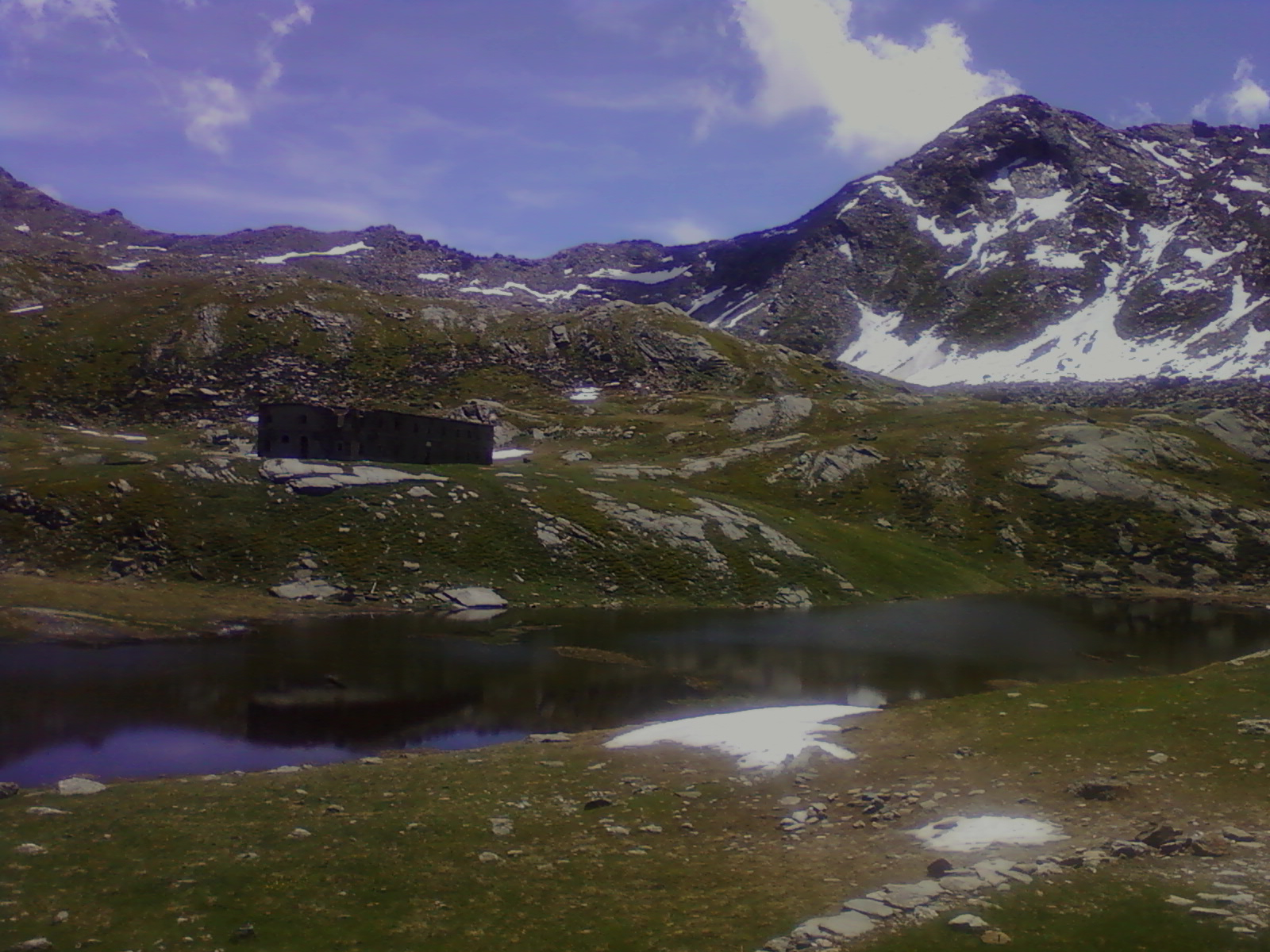
View from the Tredici Laghi plateau.

The mountain is also named Punta Cournour. While Punta Cornour appears in most of the available maps (i.e. the 1:50.000 scale IGC map Valli di Susa Chisone e Germanasca, based on the IGM official Italian 1:25.000 cartography ), Punta Cournour is reported by some older sources as, for instance, the Encyclopædia Britannica in its 1911 edition.

== Geography ==
The Punta Cornour is located on the water divide between val Germanasca (North) and val Pellice. It consists in a prominent peak clearly distinguishable also from the Po plain. The main ridge runs from SW to NE; from the summit branches out another ridge heading South. The summit of the mountain is the tripoint where the comune of Prali (Val Germanasca) meets Bobbio Pellice and Villar Pellice (both in Val Pellice). The SE slopes, belonging to the comune of Villar Pellice, are made of steep rock cliffs, while the other faces have gentler slopes with a lot of blocks.

On the summit a small metallic pillar points out a trigpoint named 067905 Punta Cornour, which belonging to the primary IGM network.

=== SOIUSA classification ===
According to SOIUSA (International Standardized Mountain Subdivision of the Alps) the mountain can be classified in the following way:

- main part = Western Alps
- major sector = South Western Alps
- section = Cottian Alps
- subsection = Central Cottian Alps
- supergroup = Catena Bucie-Grand Queyron-Orsiera
- group = Gruppo Bucie-Cornour
- subgroup = Costiera Cornour-Cialancia
- code = I/A-4.II.A.1.b

== Geology ==
From a geological point of view the mountain belongs to the Dora-Maira massif series, and is mainly composed of gneiss and mica-schists, with lenses of Augen gneiss, dating back to the pre-Triassic era.

== Access to the summit ==
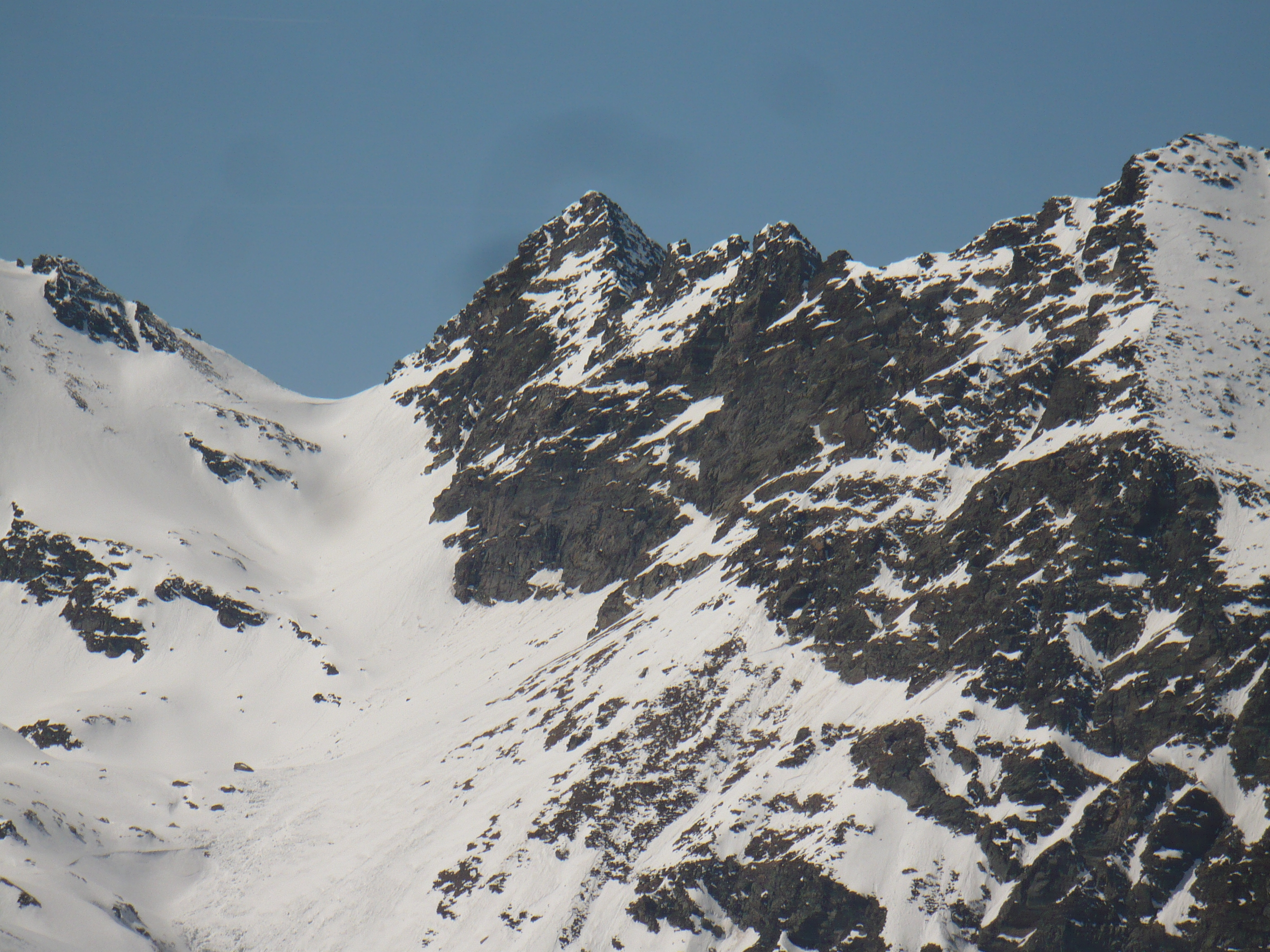
View from Grand Truc.

The normal route follows the NE ridge of the mountain. An access itinerary starts from Ghigo (comune of Prali) close to the valley station of the cable car Seggiovia dei 13 Laghi, which can be used in order to shorten the walk.

== Maps ==
- Cartografia ufficiale italiana in scala 1:25.000 e 1:100.000 (Map). IGM.
- Carta dei sentieri e dei rifugi scala 1:50.000 nr. 1 "Valli di Susa Chisone e Germanasca" (Map). Torino: Istituto Geografico Centrale.
- Carta dei sentieri e stradale scala 1:25.000 nr. 5 "Val Germanasca, Val Chisone" (Map). Ciriè: Fraternali editore.
