= Pelvo di Ciabrera =

Mountain in the Cozie Alps, Italy and France

- Pelvo di Chiabrera; Pelvat de Chabriere
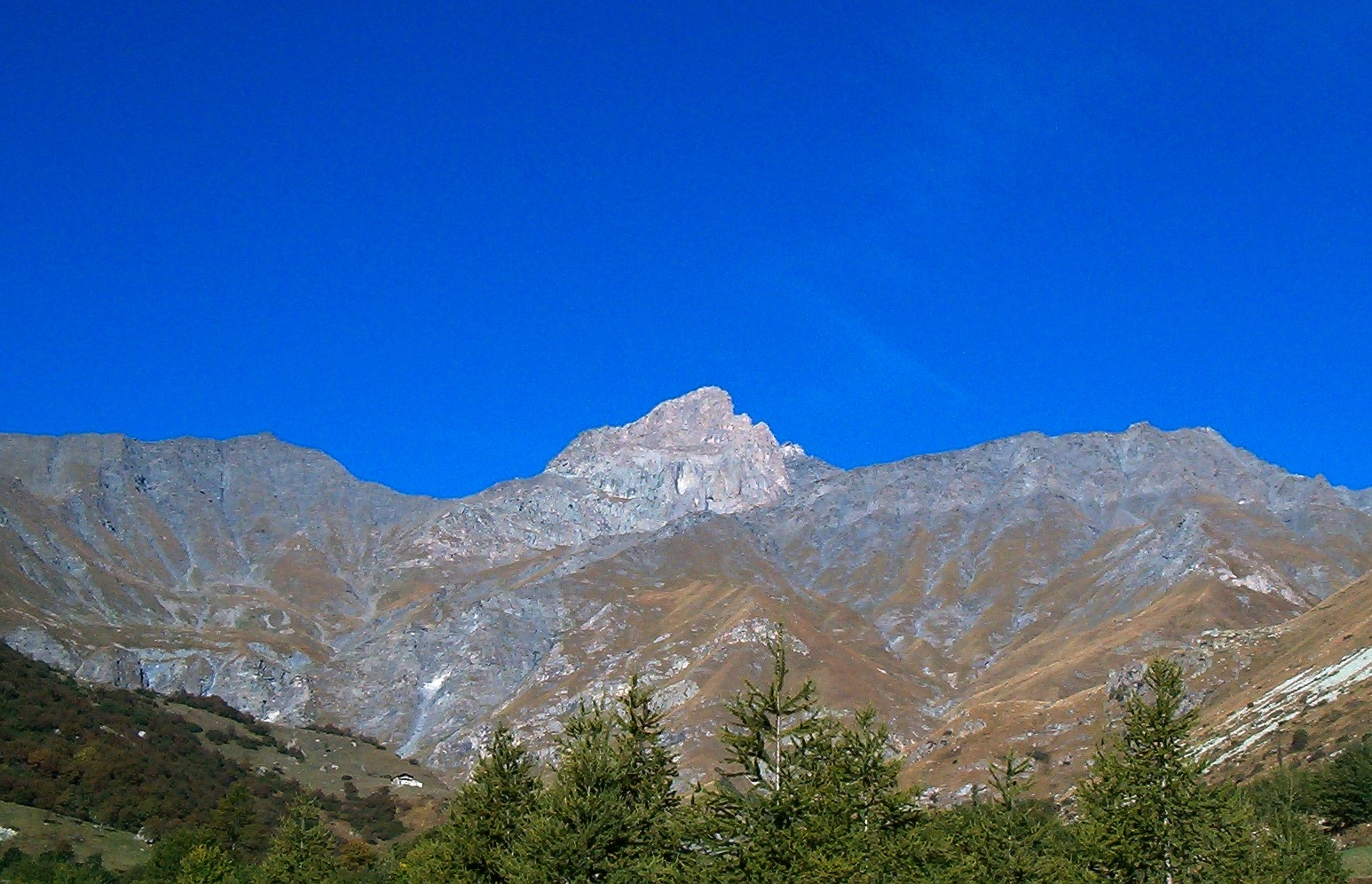
- Pelvo di Ciabrera from Sant'Anna di Bellino.

Highest point
- Prominence: 96 m (315 ft)
- Coordinates: 44.579647°N 6.933292°E

Geography
- Countries: Italy; France
- Region(s): Piedmont; Provence-Alpes-Côte d'Azur
- Parent range: Alps

The Pelvo di Ciabrera (3,152 m a.s.l.) is a mountain in the Cottian Alps, located on the main Alpine watershed between the Valle Varaita di Bellino and the Ubaye Valley.

== Characteristics ==
It lies on the border between France and Italy, between the communes of Bellino and Saint-Paul-sur-Ubaye. The main watershed ridge in this area has a general north–south trend from the Cima Mongioia to the Tête de l'Autaret. Specifically, from the Testa di Malacosta, the ridge travels in an approximately southern direction with some ups and downs until the summit; from here, it descends to the Passo di Ciabrera, then ascends to the Tête de l’Autaret, where it turns east-southeast. From the summit, a secondary ridge extends eastward, first descending, then rising to a secondary peak at 3,153 m a.s.l., which is easily mistaken for the main summit from the nearby Col de l’Autaret. The eastern slope is steep and near-vertical; the east face, nearly 400 m high, forms the upper boundary of the Valle Varaita di Bellino. The western slope consists of gentler slopes, allowing easier access to the summit. The east face drops into the underlying Vallone di Ciabrera, bounded by a rocky arc that detaches from the ridge north of the summit at 3,175 m, heading first east, then south, encircling this hanging valley, which then plunges steeply to the underlying Pian Ceiol.

On French IGN maps, the mountain's elevation is indicated as 3,157 m, and the western secondary peak as 3,166 m.

From a geological perspective, it consists of a formation of phyllitic and micaceous calcschists, belonging to the ophiolitic calcschists of the pietre verdi di Gastaldi complex.

The term Pelvo, common in the area, derives from an ancient Celtic root, indicating a pyramidal mountain with steep walls and a pointed summit; the term Ciabrera, also appearing in various toponyms in the French form Chabrière, derives from the Occitan chabra → goat. On old IGM maps, the forms Ciabrera and Chiabrera were used interchangeably; the valley to the east of the mountain is indicated as Ciabriera.

== Ascent to the summit ==
The normal route ascends the western slope, where the slopes are less steep.

The most direct route involves ascending the Vallone di Ciabriera from Pian Ceiol to reach the Passo di Ciabrera; from here, one descends on the French side into the Vallon de Chabrière to the base of the mountain's southwest slope; from there, first through a detrital gully, then over rocky slabs, the summit is reached.

There are several alternative approaches. One can ascend from the Vallone di Rui, then reverse direction and descend from the north into the Vallone di Ciabriera, joining the previous route on the eastern slope. Alternatively, one can ascend through the Gola delle Barricate toward the Col de l’Autaret, following trail U27; from the col, traverse to the Passo di Ciabrera, where the normal route is rejoined.

The route is alpine, with a difficulty rated as F.

== Bibliography ==
- Cartografia ufficiale italiana dell'Istituto Geografico Militare (IGM) at scales 1:25,000 and 1:100,000, available online
- Cartografia ufficiale francese dell'Institut géographique national (IGN), available online
- Sistema Informativo Territoriale della provincia di Cuneo, based on 1:10,000 cartography
- Istituto Geografico Centrale - Carta dei sentieri 1:50,000 no. 6 Monviso and 1:25,000 no. 106 Monviso-Sampeyre-Bobbio Pellice
