= L'Aiguille Rouge =

Mountain in France

L'Aguille Rouge
- (in Italian) Guglia Rossa
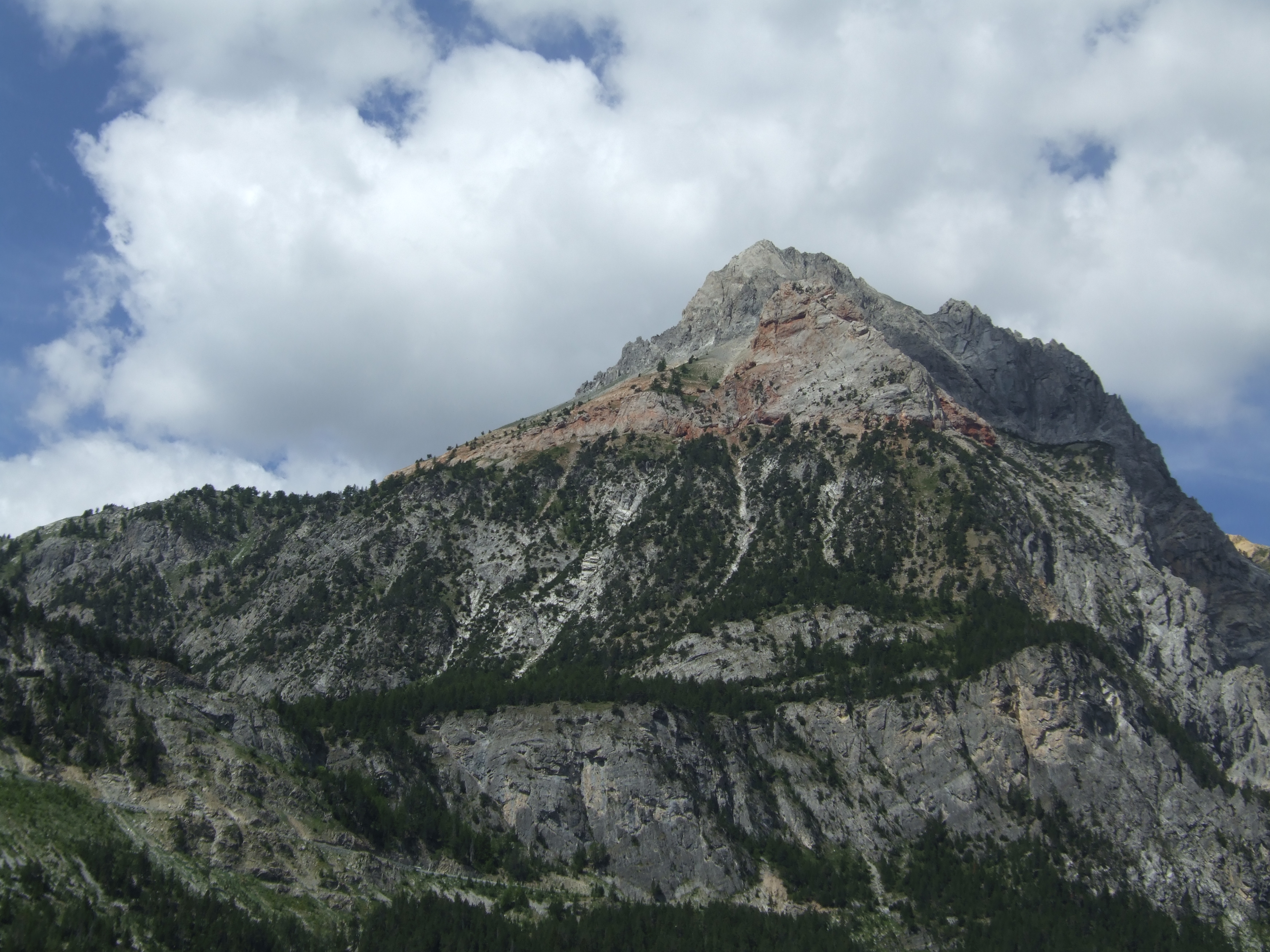

Highest point
- Elevation: 2,545 m (8,350 ft)
- Prominence: 359 m (1,178 ft)
- Isolation: 2.26 km (1.40 mi)
- Listing: Alpine mountains 2500-2999 m
- Coordinates: 45°02′45″N 6°38′42″E

Geography
- Location within Alps
- Location: Provence-Alpes-Côte d'Azur, France
- Parent range: Cottian Alps

Climbing
- Easiest route: Hike

L'Aguille Rouge (in Italian Guglia Rossa) is a 2,545 metres high mountain of the Cottian Alps, located on the Main chain of the Alps NW of the Col de l'Échelle.

== Toponymy ==
In French aiguille means needle and rouge means red. In Italian too rossa means red, while guglia means spire.

== Geography ==
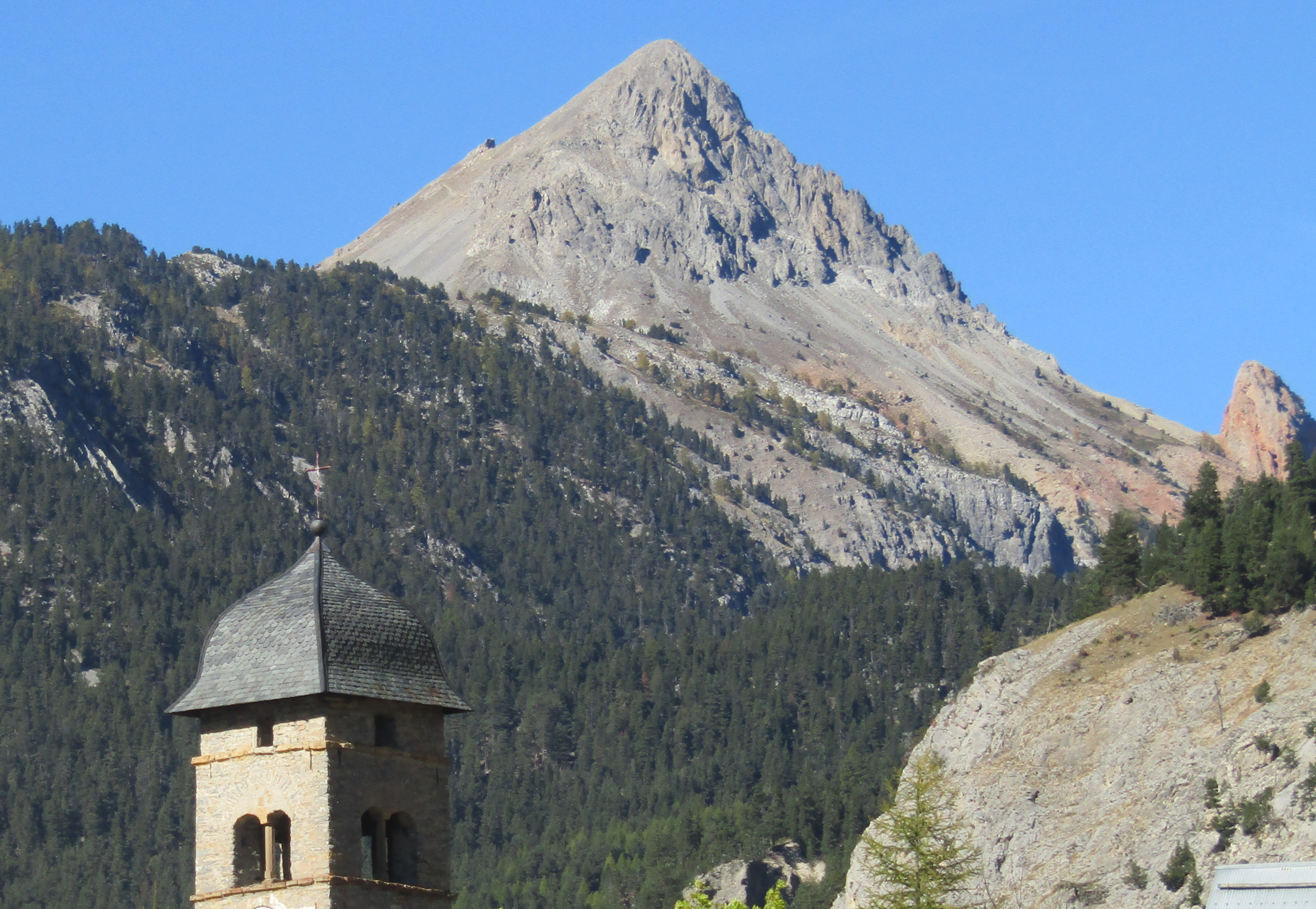
View from Plampinet

The mountain belongs to the commune of Nevache, and stands close to the French-Italian border. Administratively is part of the French department of Hautes-Alpes. Following the main watershed eastwards the Col de l'Échelle divides it from the Cima della Seur/Sommet de Guiau (2657 m), while in the opposite direction the Col de Thures (2194 m) takes it apart from the rest of the chain between Vallée Etroite (river Po basin) and Vallée de la Clarée (Rhone basin).

== History ==
The mountain till to the end of the II World War was on the Franco-Italian border. After the end of the war, following the Paris Peace Treaties signed in February 1947, the border was modified and Mount Chenaillet is now totally in France.

== Access to the summit ==
The mountain face towards Italy is very steep and rocky and can be ascended by experienced climbers, while the summit is easy to reach also by hikers by the opposite side, following a good footpath starting from the Col de l'Échelle.

== Maps ==
- French official cartography (Institut géographique national - IGN); on-line version: www.geoportail.fr
