= Viso Mozzo =

Mountain in Italy

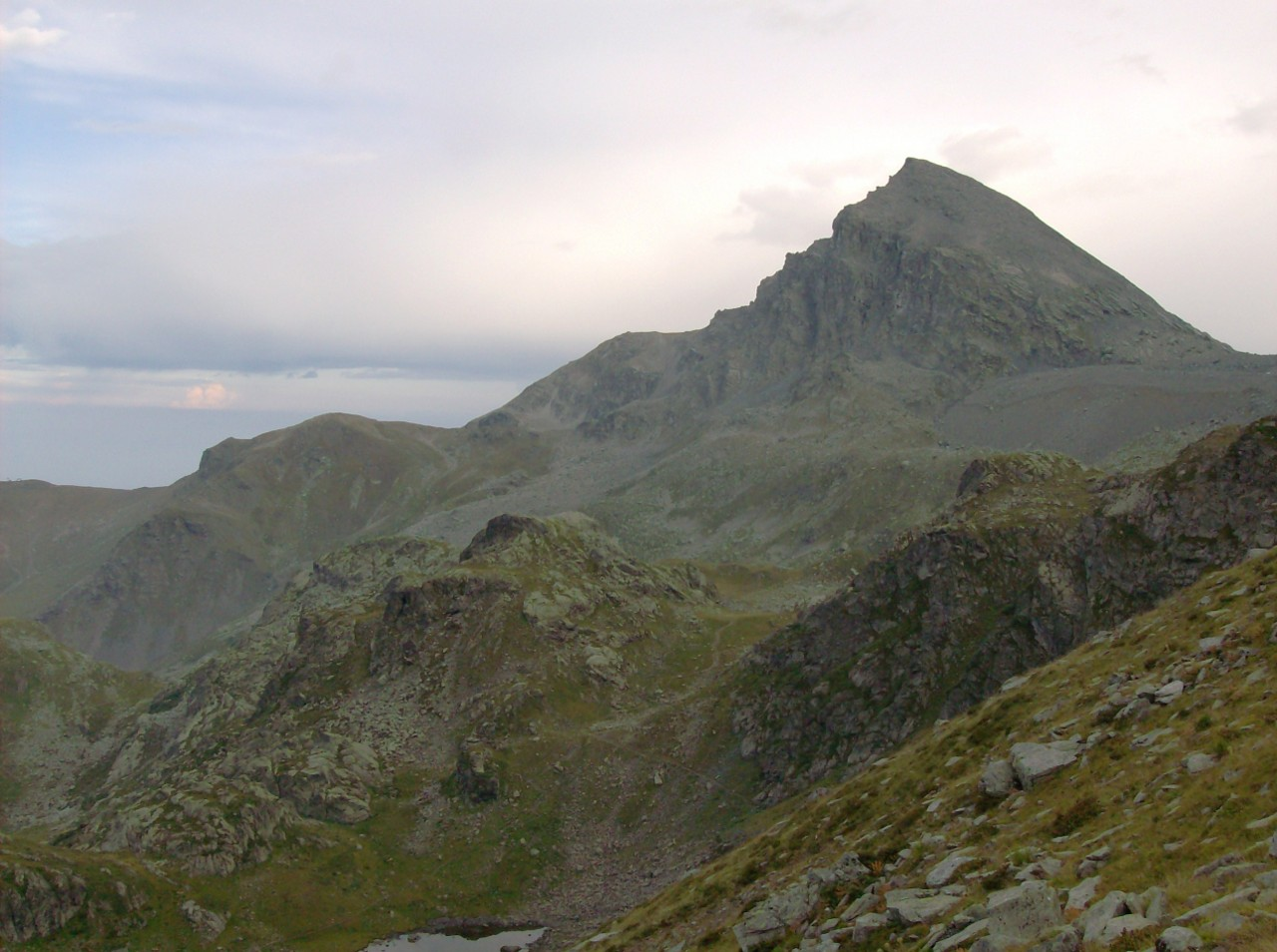
- Viso Mozzo

Highest point
- Elevation: 3,019 m (9,905 ft)
- Prominence: 369 m (1,211 ft)
- Isolation: 1.04 km (0.65 mi)
- Listing: Alpine mountains above 3000 m
- Coordinates: 44°40′40″N 7°07′23″E

Geography
- Location within Alps
- Location: Piemonte, Italy
- Parent range: Cottian Alps

Climbing
- Easiest route: Hike

The Viso Mozzo is a 3,019 metres high mountain on the Italian side of the Cottian Alps.

== Toponymy ==
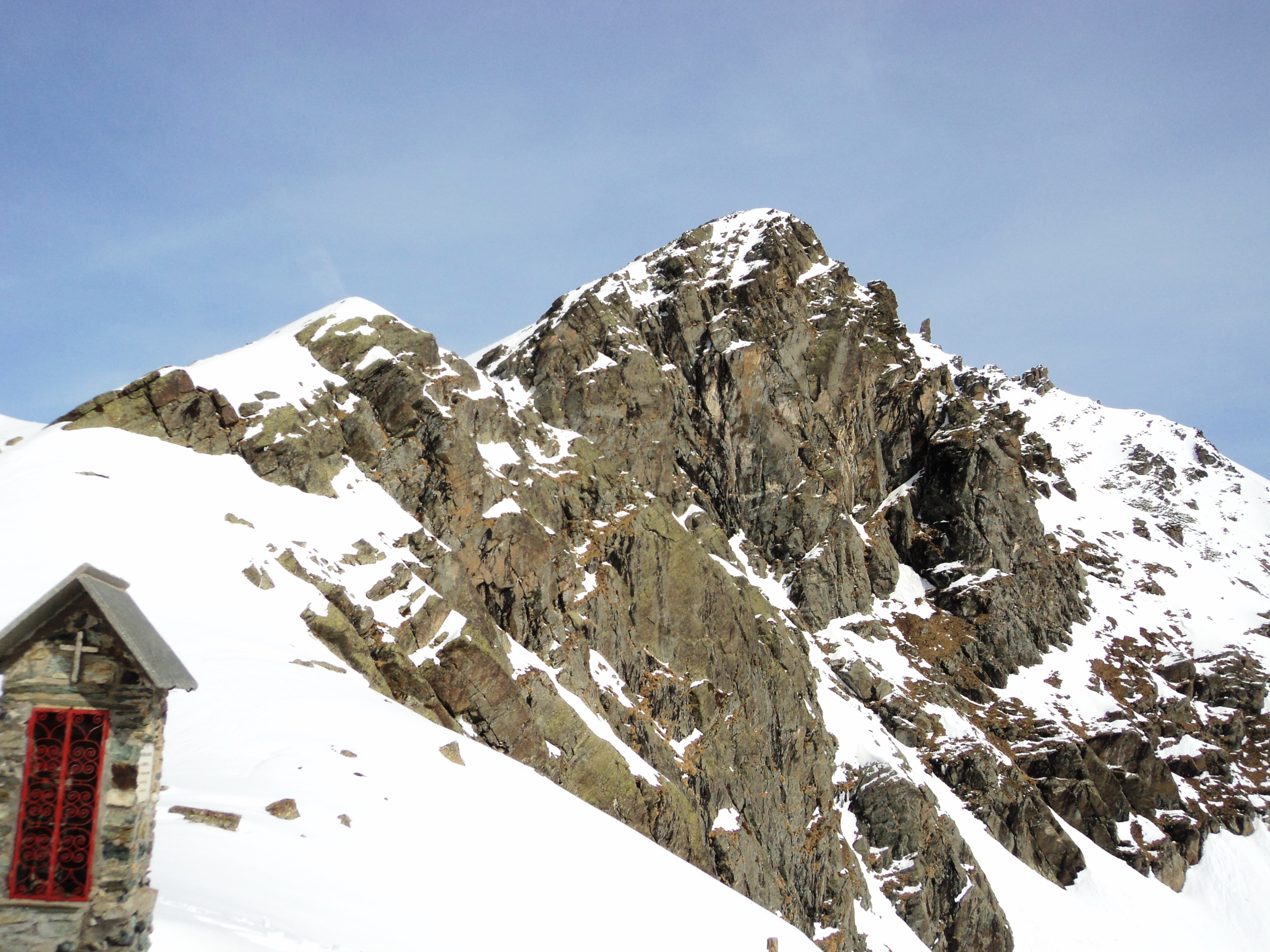
End-of-March view from refuge Quintino Sella.

In Italian viso means face, but in this context refers to the Monviso, which is very close to the Viso Mozzo, and mozzo means cut off. Thus the whole name should mean Cut-off Monviso; an old local name of the mountain is Viso-Mout.

== Geography ==
Viso Mozzo is located in the upper Valle Po and stands east-north-est of Monviso, from which is divided by the colle dei Viso (Viso Pass). Its western side, facing Monviso, is a long and almost uniform rock-field, while the other faces of the mountain are more irregular.

=== SOIUSA classification ===
According to SOIUSA (International Standardized Mountain Subdivision of the Alps) the mountain can be classified in the following way:

- main part = Western Alps
- major sector = South Western Alps
- section = Cottian Alps
- subsection = Southern Cottian Alps
- supergroup = Gruppo del Monviso i.s.a.
- group = Gruppo del Monviso p.d.
- subgroup = Nodo del Monte Viso
- code = I/A-4.I-C.8.a

== Access to the summit ==
The normal route to the Viso Mozzo runs across the west face of the mountain and does not requires . Starting from Pian del Re (known as the river Po source, 2,020 metres), one can follow the nr.V13 footpath leading to the alpine hut Quintino Sella. At colle dei Viso, leaving the main footpath and turning left, following some cairns, in roughly one hour is possible to reach the mountain top, marked by a metallic summit cross and offering an interesting view both on the Monviso massif and on the Po plain.

== Mountain huts ==
- Rifugio Quintino Sella al Monviso (2,640 m).

== Maps ==
- Istituto Geografico Militare (IGM) official maps of Italy, 1:25.000 and 1:100.000 scale, on-line version
- Sistema Informativo Territoriale della Provincia di Cuneo, based on a 1:10.000 scale numeric map of Regione Piemonte
- Istituto Geografico Centrale, Carta dei sentieri 1:50.000 scale nr. 6, Monviso, and 1:25.000 scale nr. 106, Monviso - Sampeyre - Bobbio Pellice
