= Colle della Croce =

Pedestrian pass of the Cottian Alps

Colle della Croce Col Lacroix
- Location within Alps
- Elevation: 2,299 metres (7,543 ft)
- Traversed by: bridle path

Third Approach
- Location: Provence-Alpes-Côte d'Azur, France; Piemonte, Italy
- Range: Cottian Alps
- Coordinates: 44°46′20″N 07°01′16″E

The Colle della Croce (Italian) or Col Lacroix (French, sometimes referred as Col de la Croix) is a pedestrian pass (el. 2,299 m / 7,541 ft) of the Cottian Alps.

== Etymology ==
Both in Italian and in French the name means pass of the Cross.

== Geography ==
The pass connects the villages of La Montà (commune of Ristolas, in France) and Villanova (comune of Bobbio Pellice, in Italy).

It forms the limit between the Central and the Southern Cottian Alps.

== Maps ==
- Italian official cartography (Istituto Geografico Militare - IGM); on-line version: www.pcn.minambiente.it
- French official cartography (Institut Géographique National - IGN); on-line version: www.geoportail.fr
- Istituto Geografico Centrale - Carta dei sentieri e dei rifugi scala 1:50.000 n.6 Monviso
