= Colle Sestriere =

Mountain pass in the Cottian Alps

- Col de Sestriere
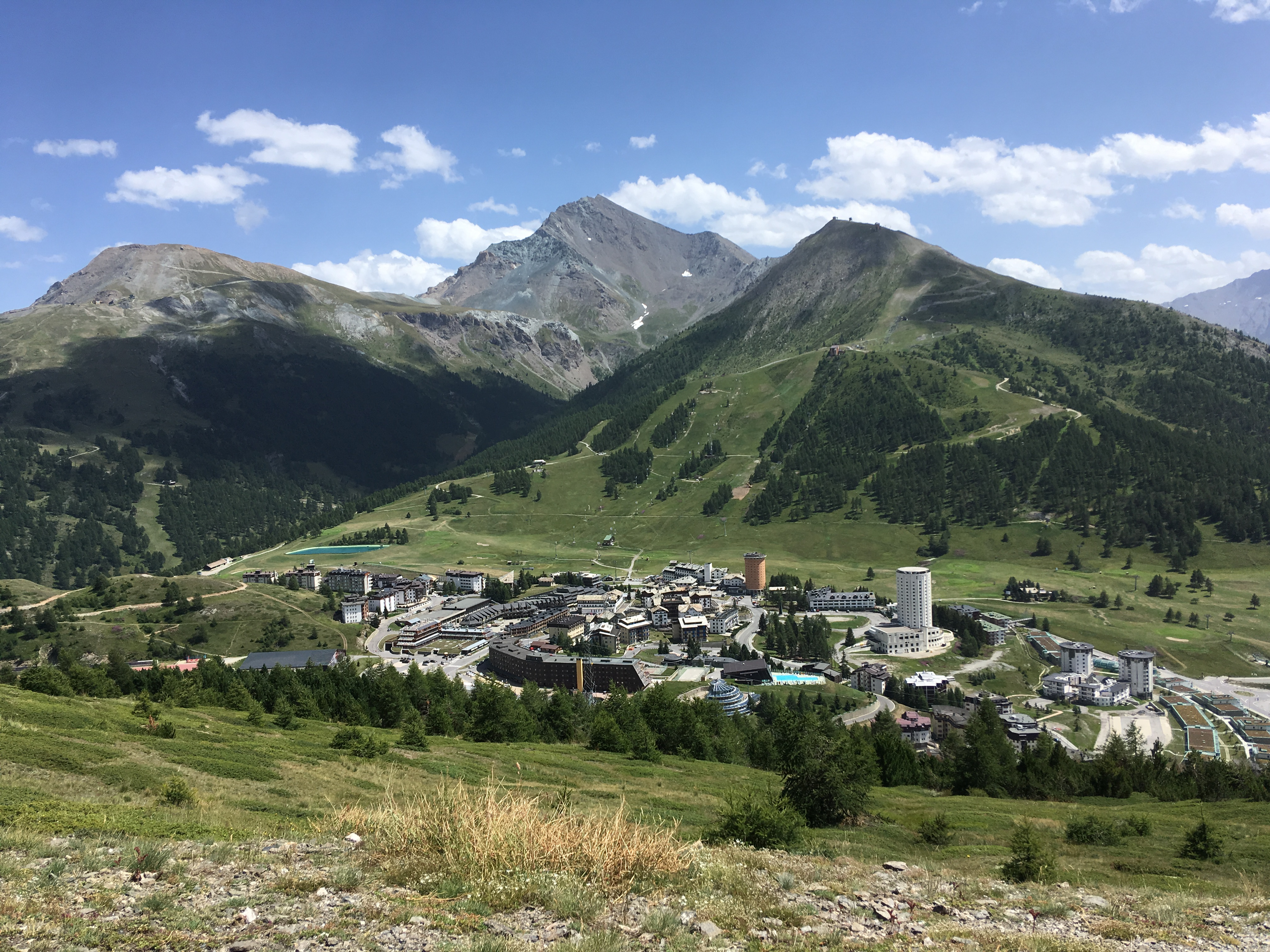

- Location within Alps
- Elevation: 2,035 m (6,677 ft)
- Traversed by: SS23

Third Approach
- Location: Piedmont, Province of Turin; Italy
- Range: Cottian Alps
- Coordinates: 44°57′34″N 06°52′59″E

Colle Sestriere, Col de Sestriere, is a mountain pass in the Cottian Alps. It is occupied by the town of Sestriere in the Province of Turin, Italy. It is 17 km (11 mi) from the French border. Its name derives from Latin: ad petram sistrariam, that is at sixty Roman miles from Turin.

It is a famous starting and arrival point in the Tour de France (7 appearances, 1952–1999) and the Giro d'Italia (4 appearances, 1991–1911). In 1952, Fausto Coppi was the first to record a stage win at Sestriere, while Charly Gaul is credited with the first crossing in 1956. Notably, it was the scene of a definitive moment in Lance Armstrong's career when he rode away from the field in a breakaway uphill finish to take the stage in the 1999 Tour de France, which was the first of his seven championships in that race. He has since been stripped of the titles.

== See also ==
- List of highest paved roads in Europe
- List of mountain passes
