= Monte Orsiera =

Mountain in Italy

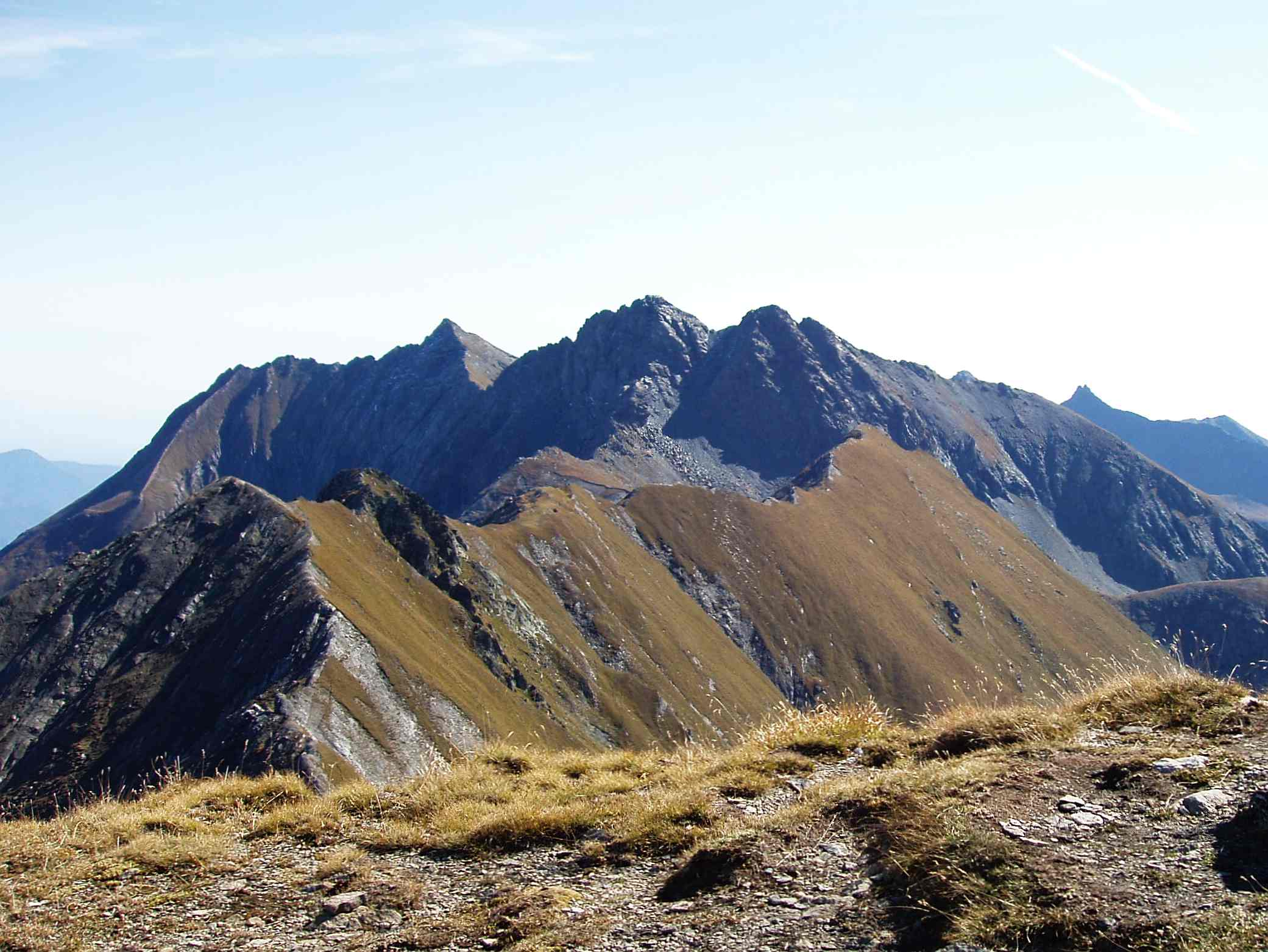
- The mountain seen from Monte Pelvo (2,773 m)

Highest point
- Elevation: 2,890 m (9,480 ft)
- Prominence: 855 m (2,805 ft)
- Isolation: 9.91 km (6.16 mi)
- Listing: Alpine mountains 2500-2999 m
- Coordinates: 45°03′53″N 07°06′24″E

Geography
- Location within Alps
- Location: Piedmont, Italy
- Parent range: Cottian Alps

Climbing
- Easiest route: South-East slopes from Rifugio Selleries

Monte Orsiera is a mountain in the Cottian Alps belonging to the Province of Turin (Italy).

== Etymology ==
The English translation of Monte Orsiera can be Mountain of the bears, an animal which in Piedmont became extinct between the end of 18th century and the beginning of 19th century.

== Geography ==
Mount Orsiera is the highest mountain of the long ridge which, starting from Sestriere, divides the Susa Valley from the Chisone valley.

=== SOIUSA classification ===
According to SOIUSA (International Standardized Mountain Subdivision of the Alps) the mountain can be classified in the following way:

- main part = Western Alps
- major sector = North Western Alps
- section = Cottian Alps
- subsection = Alpi del Monginevro
- supergroup = Catena Bucie-Grand Queyron-Orsiera
- group = Gruppo dell'Orsiera
- subgroup = Costiera Orsiera-Rocciavrè
- code = I/A-4.II-A.3.b

== Nature conservation ==
The mountain and its surrounding area are included in a regional nature park called Parco naturale Orsiera - Rocciavrè, which also is the SIC (Site of Community Importance) of code IT1110006.

== Maps ==
- Italian official cartography (Istituto Geografico Militare - IGM); on-line version: www.pcn.minambiente.it
- Istituto Geografico Centrale - Carta dei sentieri e dei rifugi scala 1:50.000 n. 1 Valli di Susa Chisone e Germanasca
