= Rognosa di Sestriere =

Mountain in Italy

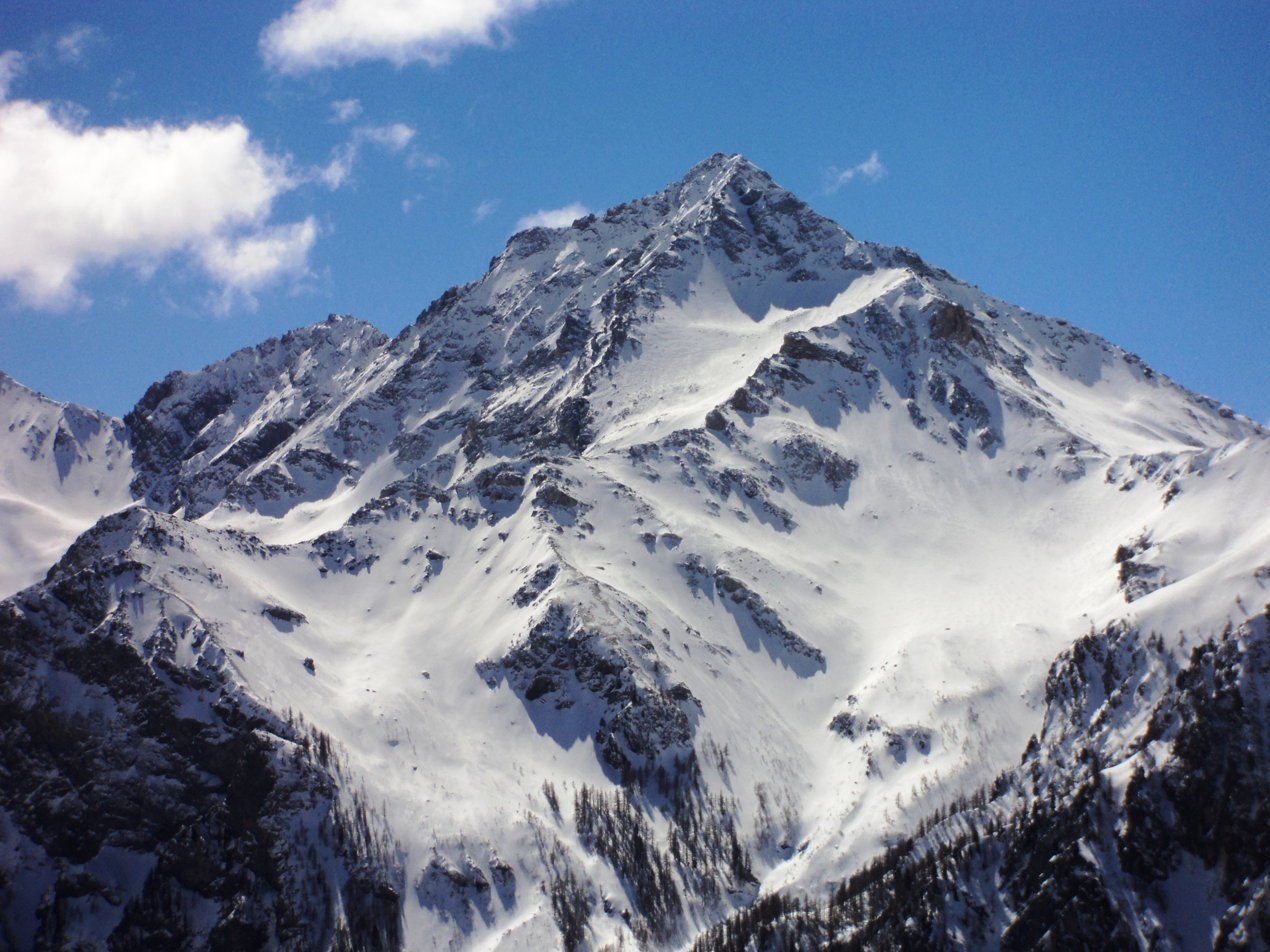
- Rognosa di Sestriere

Highest point
- Elevation: 3,280 m (10,760 ft)
- Prominence: 574 m (1,883 ft)
- Isolation: 7.76 km (4.82 mi)
- Listing: Alpine mountains above 3000 m
- Coordinates: 44°56′N 6°56′E

Geography
- Location within Alps
- Location: Piedmont, Italy
- Parent range: Cottian Alps

Rognosa di Sestriere is a mountain of the Cottian Alps in Piedmont, Italy.

== Features ==
The mountain lies near the village of Sestriere, from where it can be climbed with relative ease for anyone with mountain experience. From its summit the panorama takes in Mont Blanc, Gran Paradiso, the Dauphiné Alps, Monte Viso and the Col d'Izoard.
