= Col du Parpaillon =

Mountain pass in the French Alps

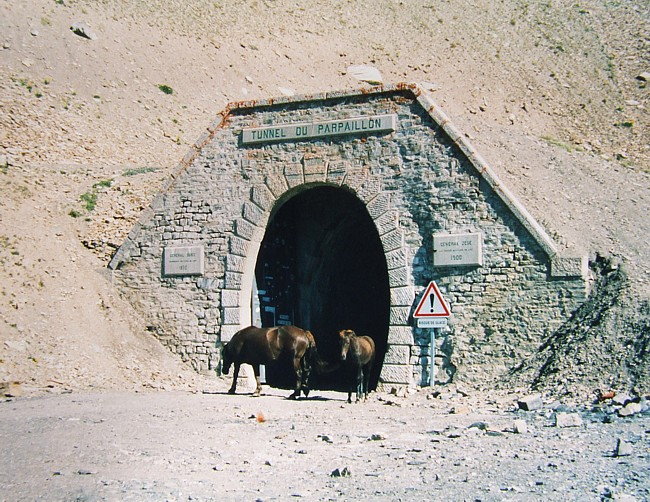
- Entrance to the Col du Parpaillon tunnel

- Location within Alps
- Elevation: 2,780 metres (9,120 ft)
- Traversed by: D29

Third Approach
- Location: Alpes-de-Haute-Provence, France; Hautes-Alpes, France
- Range: Alps
- Coordinates: 44°29′18″N 06°38′46″E

The Col du Parpaillon is a pass in the Cottian Alps of southern France in the Parpaillon Massif.

The gravel road connects La Condamine-Châtelard, the Ubaye Valley in Alpes-de-Haute-Provence department with Crévoux, Embrun in Hautes-Alpes. The crest of the pass rises to 2,780 metres (9,120 ft).

The Parpaillon Tunnel is located below the pass at an elevation of 2,637 metres (8,652 ft). It was built by the French Army starting in 1891, with work on the road and tunnel lasting until 1911, although the tunnel was completed in 1901. The arched tunnel is 520 metres (1,710 ft) in length. It is closed at either end with metal doors. The approach road is not paved and is closed in winter. The curved tunnel is among the highest in Europe.

The location was considered a strategic point as early as the 18th century. From 1692 to 1694, work proceeded on a military road suitable for artillery, at the urging of General d'Usson. The 19th century military road connects the Fort de Tournoux complex of fortifications to Embrun and points north.

Luc Moullet's 1992 film Parpaillon describes a bicycle event to and through the dark and wet tunnel, with some riders preferring to carry their bike over the pass.

A 2024 rockfall closed the road and tunnel, which have not been reopened. The tunnel itself suffered damage in 2023 and is unsafe to enter.

== See also ==
- List of highest paved roads in Europe
- List of mountain passes
