= Pic de Morgon =

Summit in the French Alps

- Grand Morgon
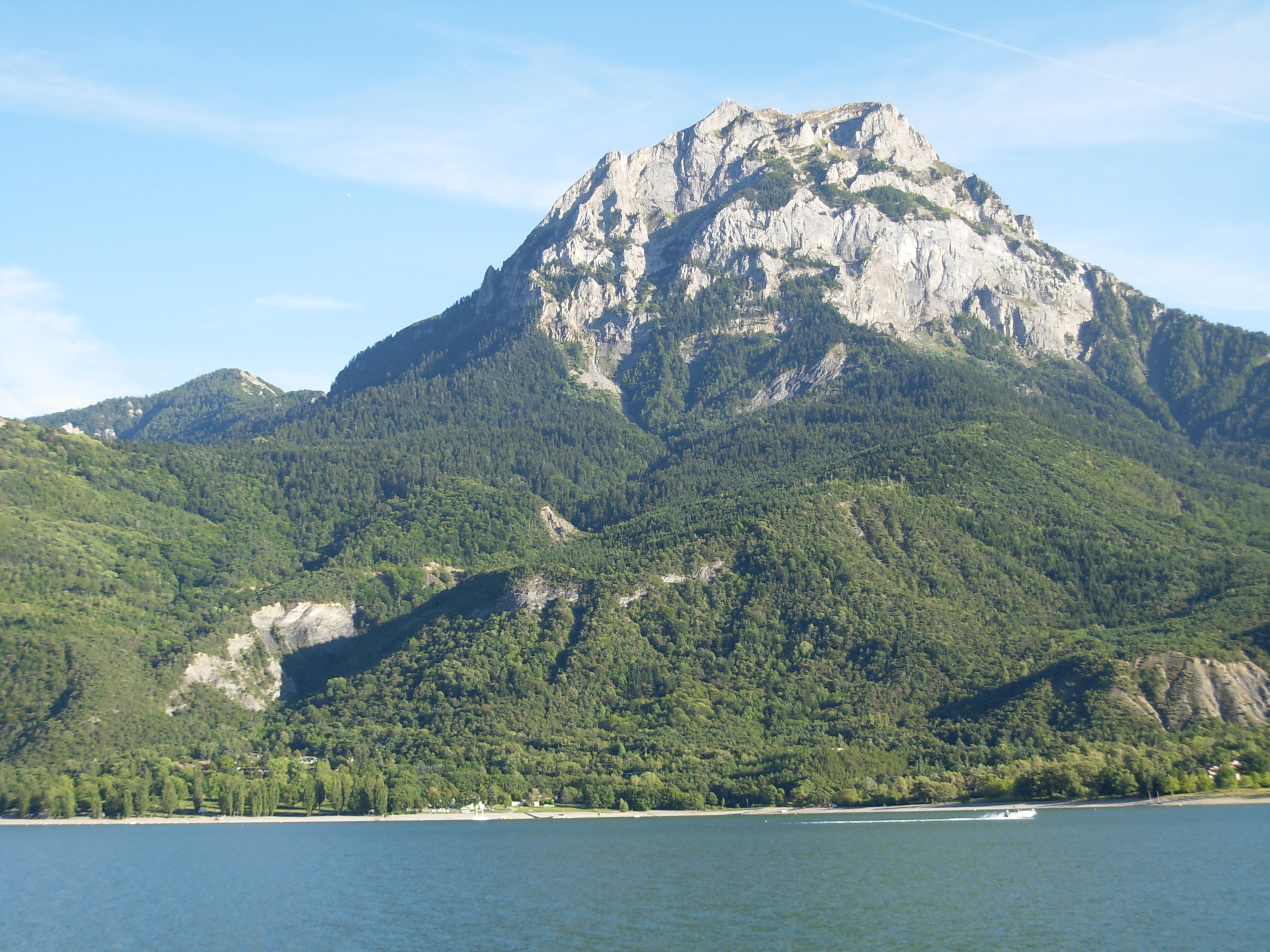
- The "Grand Morgon" over the lake Serre-Ponçon

Highest point
- Elevation: 2,324 m (7,625 ft)
- Coordinates: 44°29′31″N 6°23′51″E

Geography
- Location within Alps
- Location: Hautes-Alpes, France; Alpes-de-Haute-Provence, France
- Parent range: Alps

Pic de Morgon (or "Grand Morgon") is a summit in the French Alps between "département des Hautes-Alpes" and "département des Alpes-de-Haute-Provence". It rises 2,324 metres (7,625 ft) above sea level.

The summit is on the boundary between the "commune de Pontis", which is the highest point, and the "commune de Crots". Its northern slope is also the highest point of the "commune de Savines-le-Lac".

On "commune d'Embrun" South-West, it overlooks the abbey of Boscodon and the lake Serre-Ponçon.

The climbing is done by the Morgon's circus (Cirque de Morgon) which is well-attended during summer.
