= Col de l'Échelle =

Alpine mountain pass in France

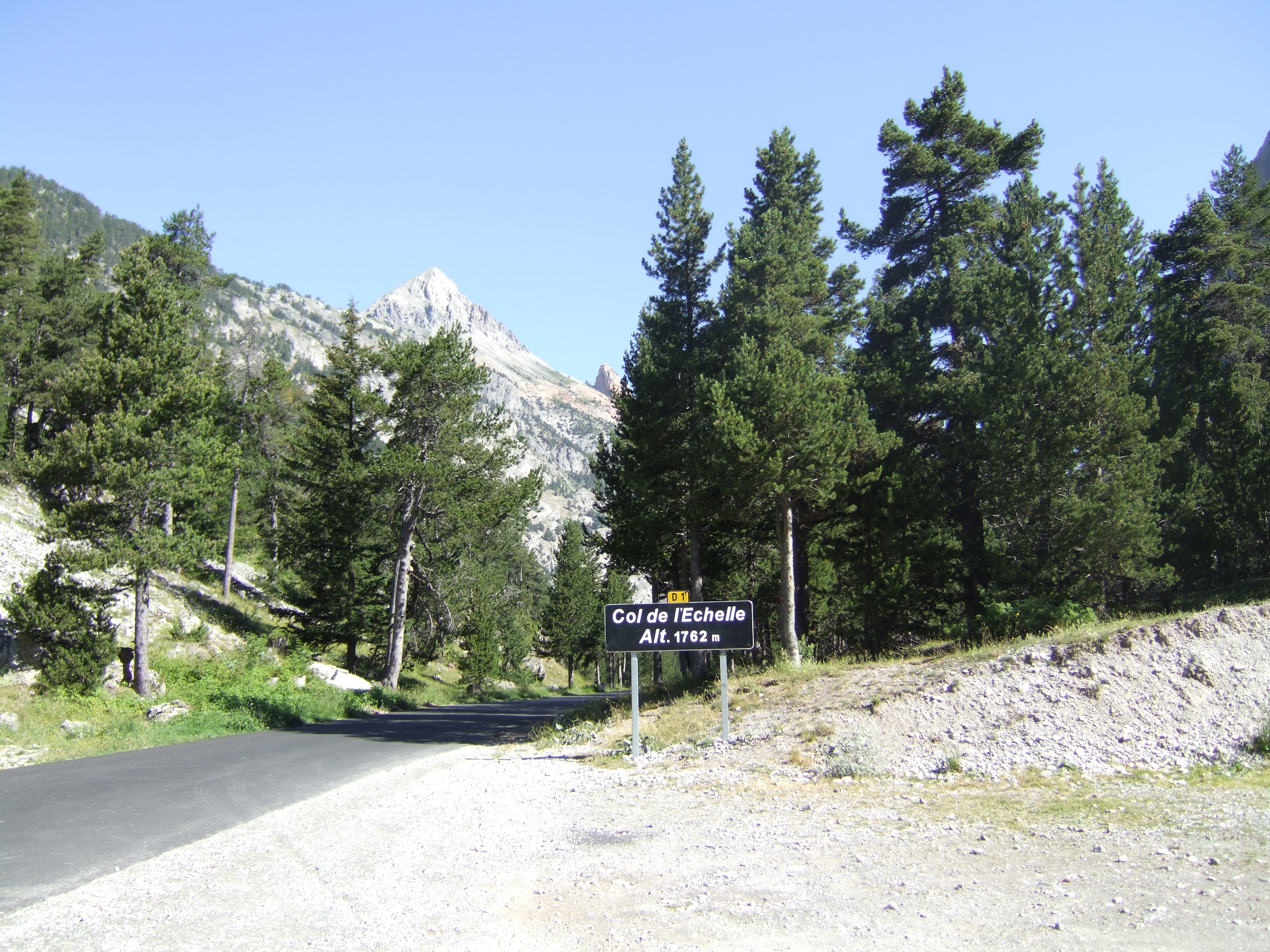

- Location within Alps
- Elevation: 1,762 metres (5,781 ft)
- Traversed by: D1T

Third Approach
- Location: Hautes-Alpes, France
- Range: Alps
- Coordinates: 45°01′35″N 6°39′25″E

Col de l'Échelle (el. 1762 m., in Italian Colle della Scala) is a mountain pass in the Alps in the department of Hautes-Alpes in France. It is the lower mountain pass between France and Italy and connects Vallée de la Clarée and Vallée Étroite (commune of Névache, Dora Riparia basin). The highest point between both valleys is actually at 1779 meter, some kilometers north of the official Col de l'Échelle at the Mauvais Pas. Between both cols, a small dry valley exists.

The col is next to Bardonecchia in Italy. In April 2018, over 100 activists of the "Identitarian" nationalist movement occupied the pass to campaign against migrants crossing from Italy to France. In August 2019, a French court sentenced three of them to a six-month jail term and fines of €2,000 each, and fined the pan-European organisation €75,000 because they deliberately led immigrants to believe they were police officers.

== See also ==
- List of highest paved roads in Europe
- List of mountain passes
