= Military Geographic Institute (Italy) =

National mapping agency for Italy

Coordinates: 43.777323°N 11.260037°E

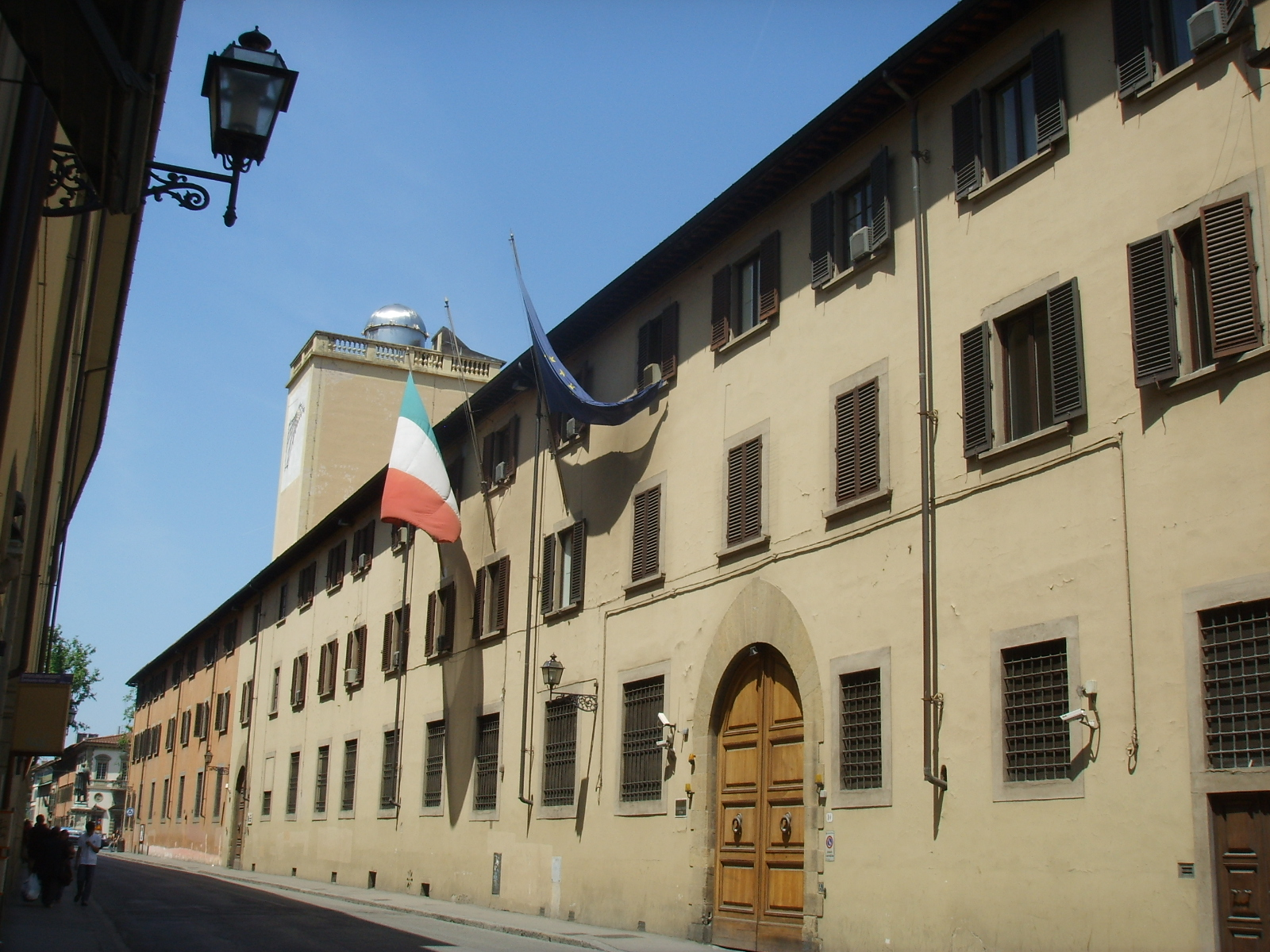
Headquarters in Florence

The Military Geographic Institute (Italian: Istituto Geografico Militare, IGM) is an Italian public organization, dependent on the Italian Army general staff (Stato Maggiore dell'Esercito). It is the national mapping agency for Italy.

== Overview ==
Its headquarters are in via Cesare Battisti, Florence, and they occupy most part of Santissima Annunziata cloister. It was established by king Vittorio Emanuele II in 1861 and the law n rules it. 68 February 2, 1960.
