= Balsamia guenerii =

Scientific classification
- Kingdom: Fungi
- Division: Ascomycota
- Class: Pezizomycetes
- Order: Pezizales
- Family: Helvellaceae
- Genus: Balsamia
- Species: B. guenerii

Binomial name
- Balsamia guenerii (H.H.Doğan, Bozok & Taşkin) K.Hansen & X.H.Wang (2019)
- Holotype: Uzunyazı plateau, Turkey

Synonyms
- Barssia gunerii H.H.Doğan, Bozok & Taşkın (2018)

Species of fungus

Balsamia guenerii is a species of truffle-like fungus in the family Helvellaceae. It occurs in Turkey.

== Taxonomy ==
Balsamia guenerii was first described scientifically in 2018 by the mycologists Hasan Hüseyin Doğan, Fuat Bozok, and Hatıra Taşkin. The fungus was originally classified in Barssia, a genus that was initially established in 1925 with the type species B. oregonensis, discovered in Oregon, USA. Prior to the description of B. guenerii, the genus contained five recognized species worldwide. All known species in this genus have been found exclusively in the northern hemisphere, generally at latitudes around 30° north.

In 2019, Hansen and colleagues published a comprehensive phylogenetic study of the family Helvellaceae, revealing that the genera Barssia and Balsamia could not be distinguished based on morphological or molecular data. Based on their analysis of LSU rDNA, RPB2, and EF-1α gene sequences, they demonstrated that Barssia should be placed in synonymy with Balsamia. Consequently, Barssia guenerii was transferred to Balsamia as Balsamia gunerii.

Molecular phylogenetics analysis confirmed that B. guenerii represents a distinct species within the genus. The analysis revealed that B. guenerii is most closely related to B. maroccana (with 96% similarity in ITS rDNA and 99% in LSU rDNA sequences), followed by B. hellenica (95% and 99% similarity, respectively), and B. oregonensis (82% and 94% similarity, respectively).

Despite these genetic similarities, B. guenerii can be readily distinguished from its congeners by its smaller spore size, spore shape, and ecological niche. The species epithet guenerii honours Şaban Güneri, who collected the first specimens of this fungus in Turkey's cedar forests. The epithet was spelled "gunerii" in the original publication, but has since been corrected to guenerii.

== Description ==
Barssia guenerii grows completely beneath the soil surface, requiring digging to locate specimens, which are typically found 3–5 cm deep. The fruiting body (ascocarp) measures 0.9–3.3 cm wide by 0.7–2.5 cm tall, with an irregularly rounded shape, often featuring a depression at the top. The outer surface is reddish to brownish-red or sometimes blackish brown in colour, covered with distinctive polygon-shaped warts that are densely packed together in younger specimens and more separated as the fungus matures When cut open, B. guenerii reveals a whitish or yellowish interior that has a lubricous (slippery) texture. This inner flesh often contains irregular, winding, maze-like veins throughout its structure.

Under microscopic examination, the fungus produces its spores within specialized sac-like cells called asci. These asci are mostly pear-shaped or broadly ellipsoid and measure 157–202 by 35.5–45.5 micrometres (μm). Each ascus contains eight spores. The spores themselves (ascospores) are nearly round to egg-shaped, smooth-surfaced, transparent when viewed under a microscope, and measure approximately 21 by 18 μm.
