= Torre Pellice =

Torre Pellice La Torre de Pèlis, La Tòr, La Tour
- Comune
- Comune di Torre Pellice
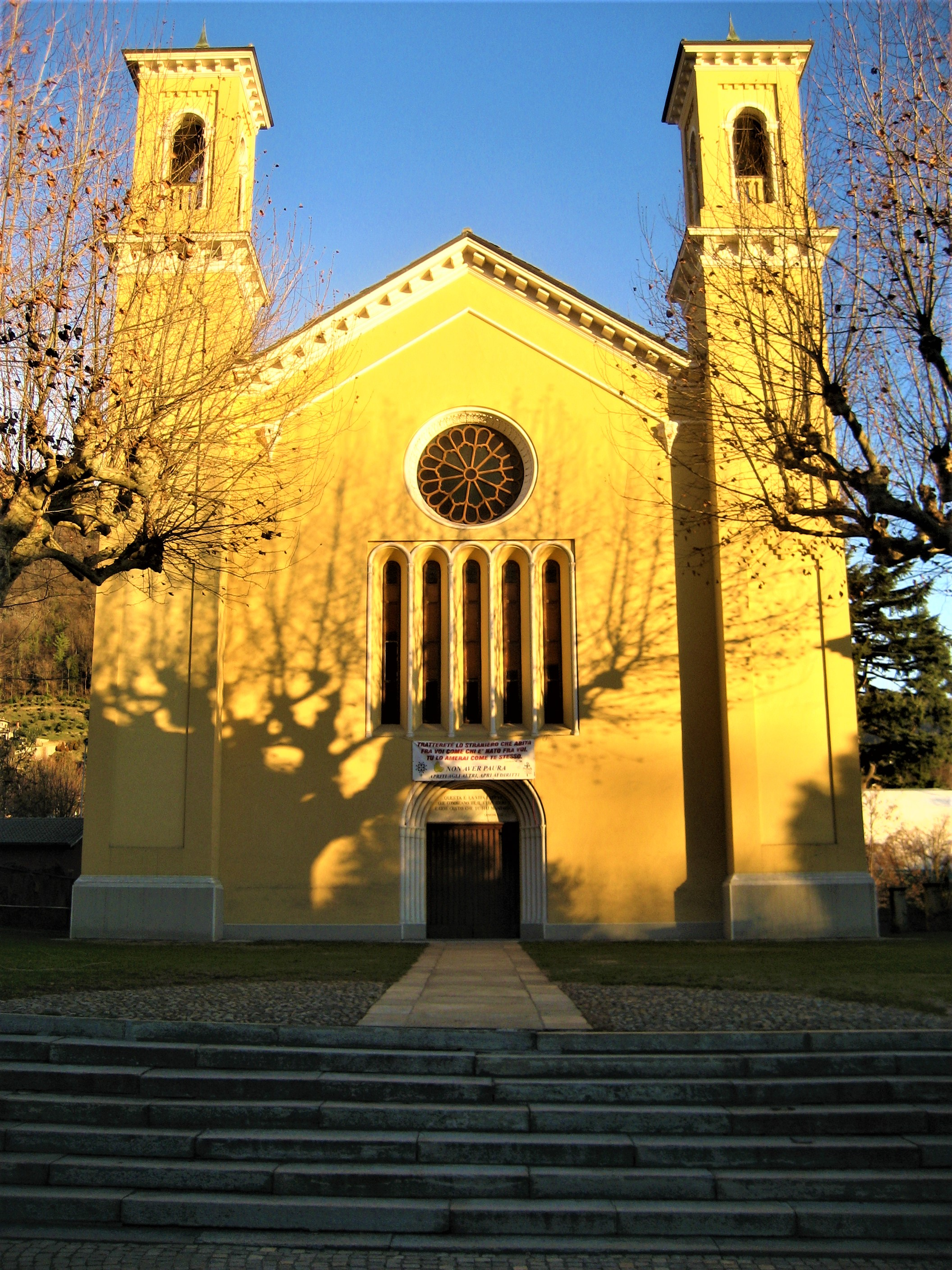
- The Waldensian Church in Torre Pellice

- Coat of arms

- Location within Italy Location within Piedmont
- Coordinates: 44°49′N 7°14′E
- Country: Italy
- Region: Piedmont
- Metropolitan city: Turin (TO)

Government
  - Mayor: Marco Cogno (Civic list)

Area
  - Total: 21.10 km^{2} (8.15 sq mi)
- Highest elevation: 2,269 m (7,444 ft)
- Lowest elevation: 500 m (1,600 ft)

Population (1-1-2017)
  - Total: 4,545
  - Density: 215.4/km^{2} (557.9/sq mi)
- Demonym: Torrese(i)
- Time zone: UTC+1 (CET)
  - Summer (DST): UTC+2 (CEST)
- Postal code: 10066
- Dialing code: 0121

Torre Pellice (Vivaro-Alpine: La Torre de Pèlis, Piedmontese: La Tòr, French: La Tour) is a comune (municipality) in the Metropolitan City of Turin in the Italian region Piedmont, located about 45 kilometres (28 mi) southwest of Turin. The municipality is about 17.7 kilometers (11 mi) from the French border. It is crossed by the Pellice river.

Torre Pellice is the centre of the Waldensian church. The town is home to the Museo Valdese, which displays over 250 objects from more than 800 years of Waldensian culture, including weapons, bandages, relics, liturgical objects, medals, coins, paintings, and engravings. The Waldensians arrived in the valley in the early 13th century. In a grotto nearby Torre Pellice they held the Synod of Chanforan, by which they adhered to the Protestant Reformation (1590).

It borders the municipalities of Angrogna, Villar Pellice, Luserna San Giovanni, Rorà.

== Notable residents ==
- John Charles Beckwith (British Army officer)
- Migjeni, Albanian poet and writer
- Davide Giordano, physician, surgeon, and former president of Ateneo Veneto
- Andrea Chiarotti, ice sledge hockey Paralympian and coach

== Twin towns ==
- Guardia Piemontese, Italy
- Valdese, North Carolina, United States
