= Jean Pierre Meille =

Italian Protestant pastor and evangelist (1817–1887)

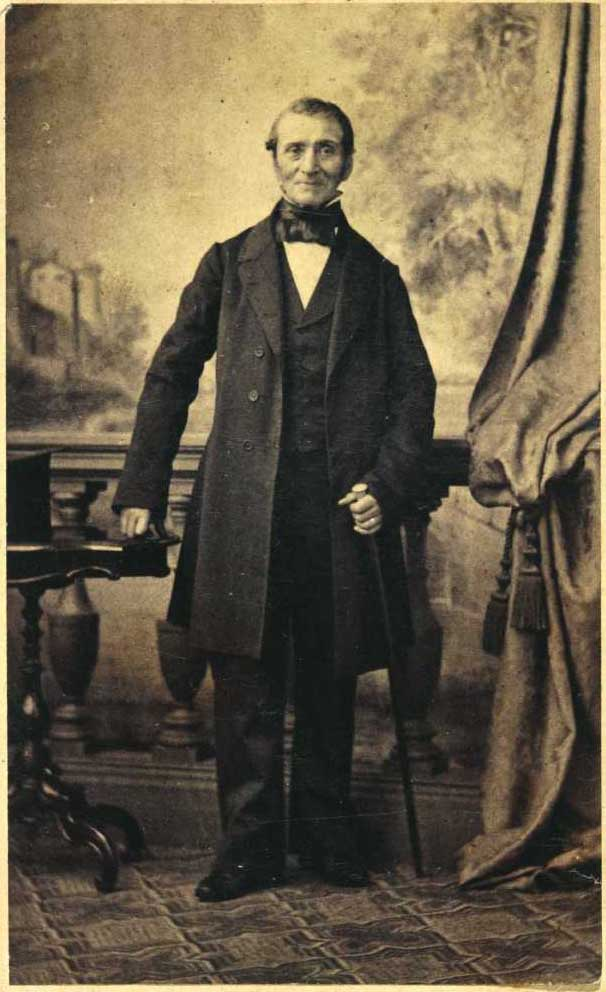
Jean-Pierre Meille, prominent Italian protestant pastor and founder of the Claudiana publishing house.

Jean Pierre Meille (Bobbio Pellice, 1817 – Luserna San Giovanni, 1887) was an Italian Protestant pastor and evangelist and a key figure in promoting the foundation of the Claudiana publishing house in Turin.

== Education ==
Meille was born in the Waldensian valleys of the Cottian Alps and was the son of a Waldesian parish schoolmaster. He was educated at the infants' school in Luserna San Giovanni where his father had been appointed schoolmaster, and from the age of nine at the Latin school which was held in Les Coppiers (Coppieri, a hamlet to the west of Torre Pellice), or other locations depending on the convenience of whoever was in charge of it. (This was before the liberal constitution of the Sardinian State was introduced allowing non-Catholic children to be educated in public schools.)

In 1831 he entered the Higher School of the Valleys, the forerunner of the Waldensian College in Torre Pellice set up to train Waldensian ministers, and after three years moved on to study theology in Lausanne (Switzerland). Here he was influenced by the theology of the Réveil ("Awakening") and was much influenced by Alexandre Vinet.

== Pastoral work ==
Meille completed his studies in 1841 and returned to the valleys, but as he was too young to be ordained he was appointed to the teaching staff at the Waldensian College, returning to Lausanne for further study over the summer breaks. He was eventually ordained at the end of 1844, but continued as a rector (professor) at the college, at the same time developing a network of Sunday schools in the valleys.

The publication of letters patent allowing freedom of worship in the Kingdom of Sardinia, followed by the new constitution, known as the Albertine Statute, in 1848, granting full civil rights to Piedmontese citizens of Waldensian faith. Meille responded by founding the first Waldensian journal, L’Echo des Vallées, published monthly.

The language of the valleys at that time was mainly French or a local patois based on the Provençal dialect, and this was seen as a limitation on the further expansion of the Waldensian Church. A notable English supporter and philanthropist, General Charles Beckwith, with the approval of the church authorities, funded Meille and a number of his associates to study in Florence for eight months in late 1848 to improve their Italian.

Once the turmoil of defeat at the battle of Novara in the First War of Independence had settled, the Waldensians turned their attention to the evangelisation of their fellow countrymen, starting with the city of Turin. For about twenty years, a small Waldensian Church had existed there, tolerated by the Sardinian government because it had been established under the protection of the Prussian ambassador. The initial step was to send, in rotation, one of the young ministers returning from Tuscany to preach once a month in Italian. In late 1850, Meille was assigned permanently to Turin as an Italian evangelist. The Turin congregation grew quickly, and with the support of Beckwith and the first Waldensian deputy in the Sub-Alpine parliament, Giuseppe Malan, a substantial church was built on Corso Vittorio Emanuele II.

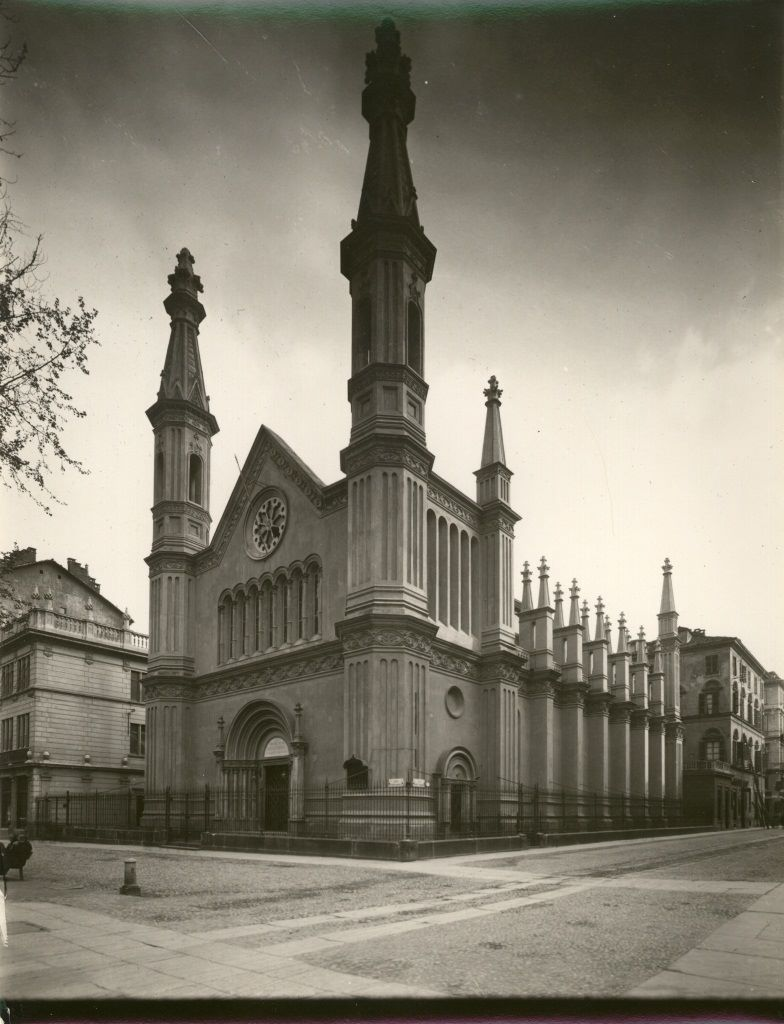
Waldensian temple, Turin built 1851–53 by Beckwith with architect Luigi Formento

A former Roman Catholic priest, Luigi Desanctis (1808–1869), was assigned to Meille as an assistant in 1852. After a short and very constructive initial period, the ideological disputes to which Desanctis was prone contributed in 1854 to a split in the nascent Italian evangelical movement between the presbyterian Waldensians and a congregationalist faction who broke away to form the Società Evangelica Italiana.

Overcoming this, Meille was appointed pastor to the Turin congregation in 1860, a position he held until 1884.

== Welfare and Cultural Achievements ==
Meille started an Italian language evangelical journal, La Buona Novella, and in 1855 he helped establish Claudiana, a publishing house central to Italian Protestantism. He was the principal author of the Waldensian Constitution published in 1855, and later a Waldensian liturgy and catechism. He was also the author of a detailed biography of General Beckwith (in French), and a memoir of his eldest son Luigi, who had died at the age of twenty in 1860.

Meille also initiated and developed numerous associations within the Waldensian community to support needy families, unemployed women, children in poor health, and young people seeking vocational training. In 1865, he founded the Waldensian Artisans’ Institute which addressed social promotion and professional training for young people in the Waldensian Valleys of Piedmont, rather than purely welfare activities.

Additionally, Meille oversaw the restructuring of the Waldensian Hospital in Turin, originally founded in 1843 by Pastor Amedeo Bert. A significant financial contribution from banker Luigi Long allowed for the construction, in 1871, of a new building on Via Berthollet. Lastly, he established the Waldensian House in Borgio Verezzi (Savona), a seaside retreat for children from the Waldensian Valleys and Turin.

He was commissioned to represent the Waldensian Church at the Synod of the Union des Eglises Evangéliques in 1860, at the Conference of the Evangelical Alliance in Geneva in the summer of 1861. He also went on a mission to Great Britain and Ireland in 1862 and 1864 to raise funds for the Waldensian Church.

In 1867 he led an evangelisation team in Emilia-Romagna, the Veneto and part of Lombardy; he inaugurated a temple in Naples (1865) and in Guastalla (1868). Shortly before his death, in 1887, he was awarded the title of knight of the Order of Saints Maurice and Lazarus.

== Publications ==
- Louis M. mort à vingt ans: quelques souvenirs recuieillis par son père. Florence: Claudiana, 1867.
- General Beckwith: His Life and Labours Among the Waldenses of Piedmont. London: T. Nelson, 1873. OCLC 680315708
- Il catechismo ossia Sunto della dottrina cristiana secondo la parola di Dio. Turin, Claudiana, 1874. OCLC 1288533935
- Lettera rispettosa di un torinese a sua eminenza il cardinale Alimonda arcivescovo di Torino. Turin: Stamperia dell'Unione tipografico-editrice, 1884. OCLC 1404586241
- Sermons par J.-P. Meille, pasteur de l'Église Vaudoise de Turin, précédées d'une notice biographique, Lausanne: Georges Bridel, 1889. OCLC 716067190
