= Giardino Botanico Alpino "Bruno Peyronel" =

Botanical garden in Italy

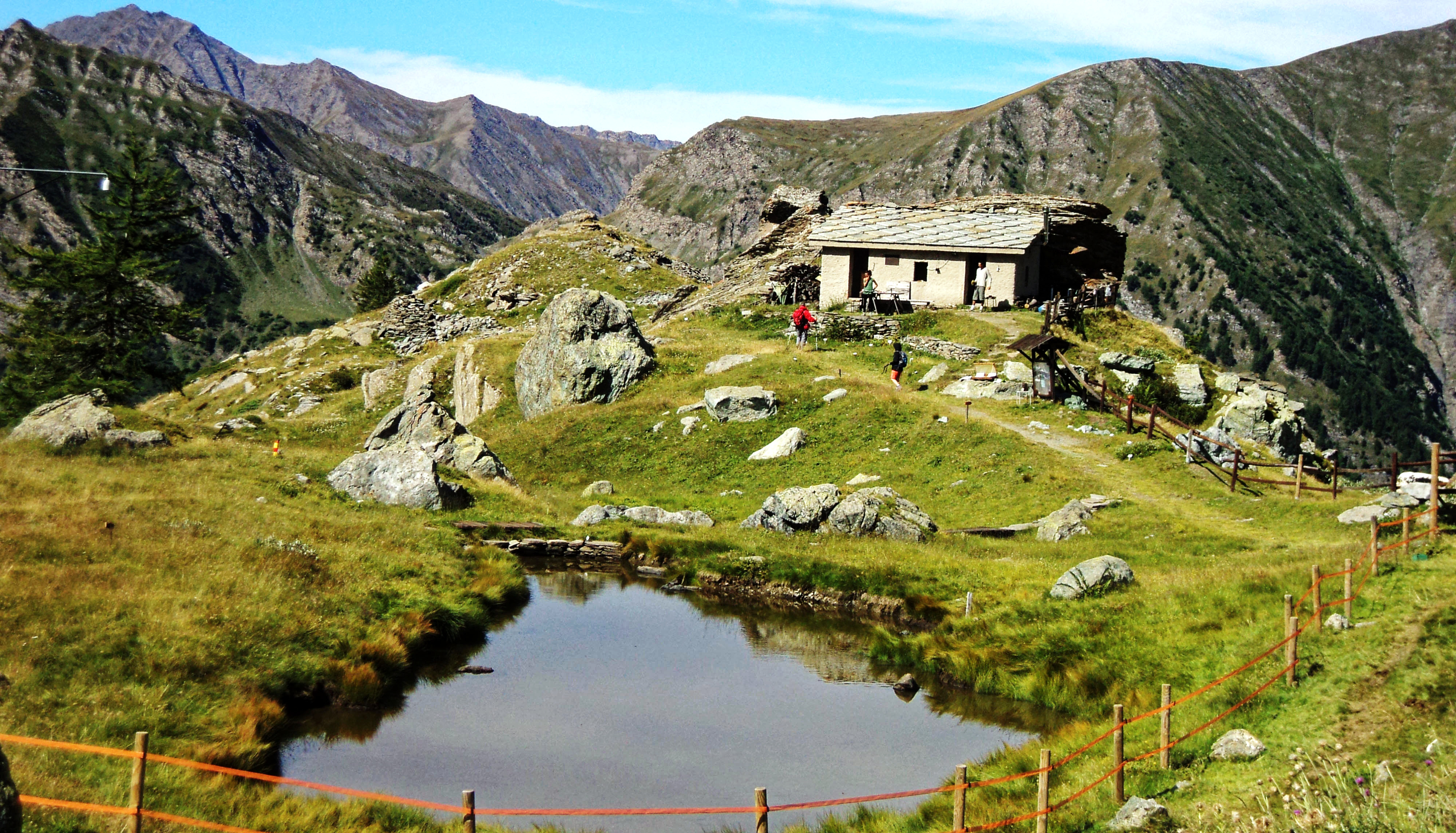
The Peyronel Botanical Garden at Colle Barant in the Pellice Valley

The Giardino Botanico Alpino "Bruno Peyronel" (about 17,000 m^{2}) is a botanical garden and nature preserve specializing in alpine plants. It is located at an altitude of 2290 meters in the Colle Barant of Val Pellice, Bobbio Pellice, Metropolitan City of Turin, Piedmont, Italy.

The garden opened in 1991 with a dedication to the memory of Bruno Peyronel (1919-1982), naturalist and botanist. Today it contains over 300 species of indigenous alpine plants, many of them marked with individual signs, amidst mountain environments ranging from various types of pasture and wetlands through stony areas, ridges, and debris. Species include Carex sempervirens, Dryas octopetala, Festuca violacea, and Salix herbacea.

== See also ==
- List of botanical gardens in Italy
