= Bobbio Pellice =

- Comune
- Comune di Bobbio Pellice
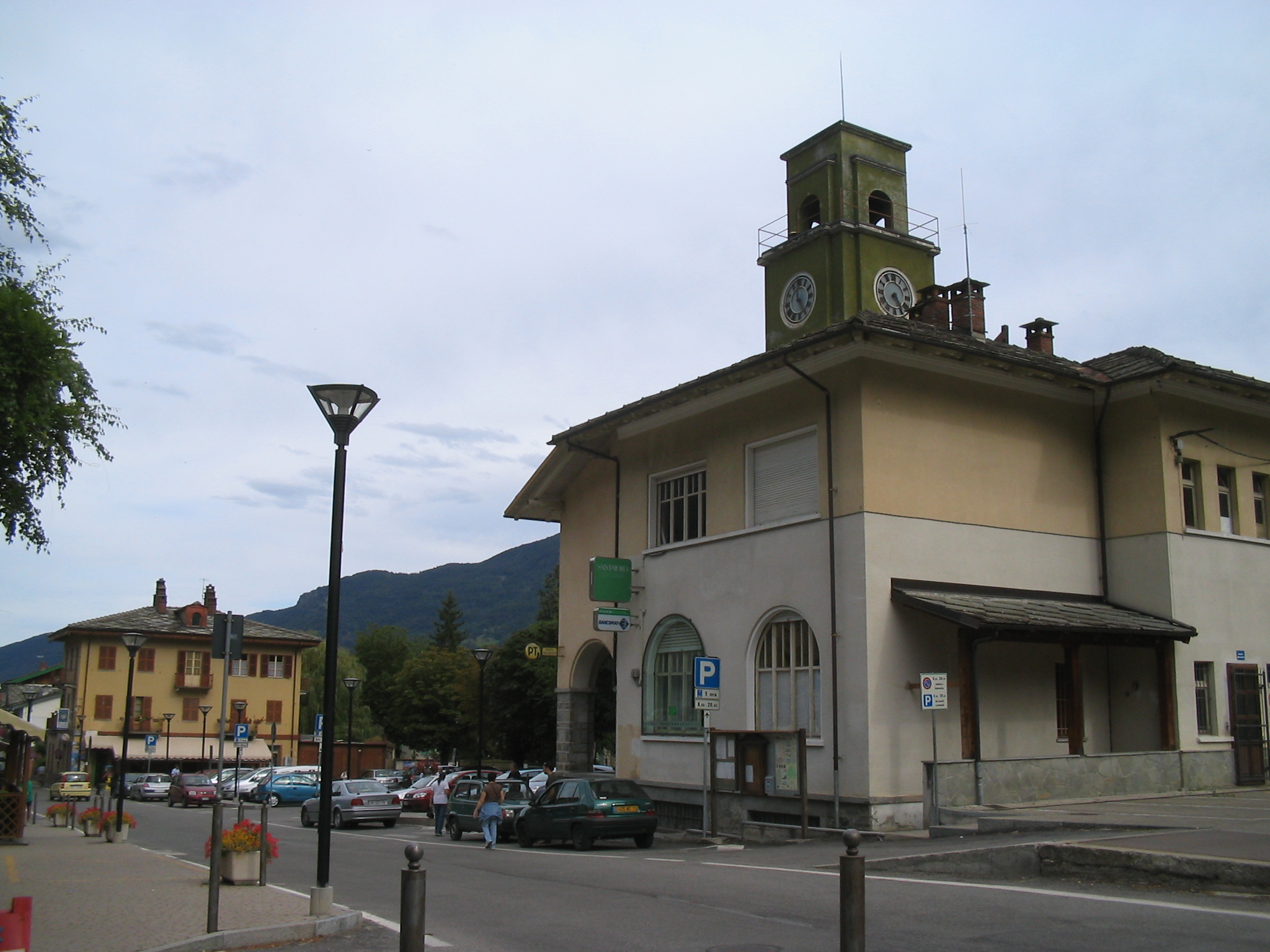

- Coat of arms

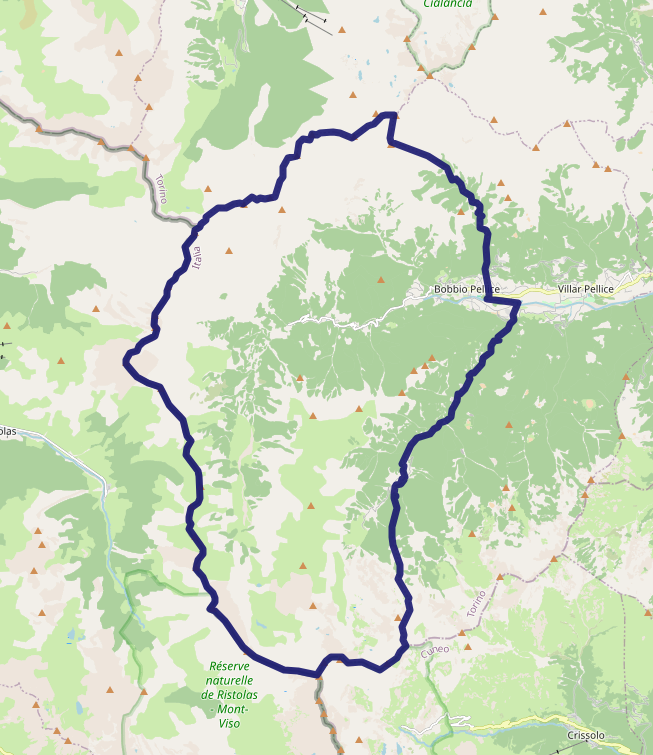
- OSM map of Bobbio Pellice.

- Location within Italy Location within Piedmont
- Coordinates: 44°48′N 7°7′E
- Country: Italy
- Region: Piedmont
- Metropolitan city: Turin (TO)
- Frazioni: Chiot, Laus, Payant, Villanova, Abses, Malpertus, Perlà, Podio

Government
  - Mayor: Patrizia Geymonat

Area
  - Total: 94.08 km^{2} (36.32 sq mi)
- Elevation: 732 m (2,402 ft)

Population (1-1-2017)
  - Total: 568
  - Density: 6.04/km^{2} (15.6/sq mi)
- Demonym: Bobbiese(i)
- Time zone: UTC+1 (CET)
  - Summer (DST): UTC+2 (CEST)
- Postal code: 10060
- Dialing code: 0121

Bobbio Pellice (French: Bobbi) is a comune (municipality) in the Metropolitan City of Turin in the Italian region Piedmont, located about 50 kilometres (31 mi) southwest of Turin, on the border with France and at the end of the Val Pellice

Bobbio Pellice borders the following municipalities: Abriès (France), Crissolo, Prali, Ristolas (France), and Villar Pellice. Bobbio was the hometown of the Occitan colonists who populated Guardia Piemontese, in Calabria.

== Main sights ==
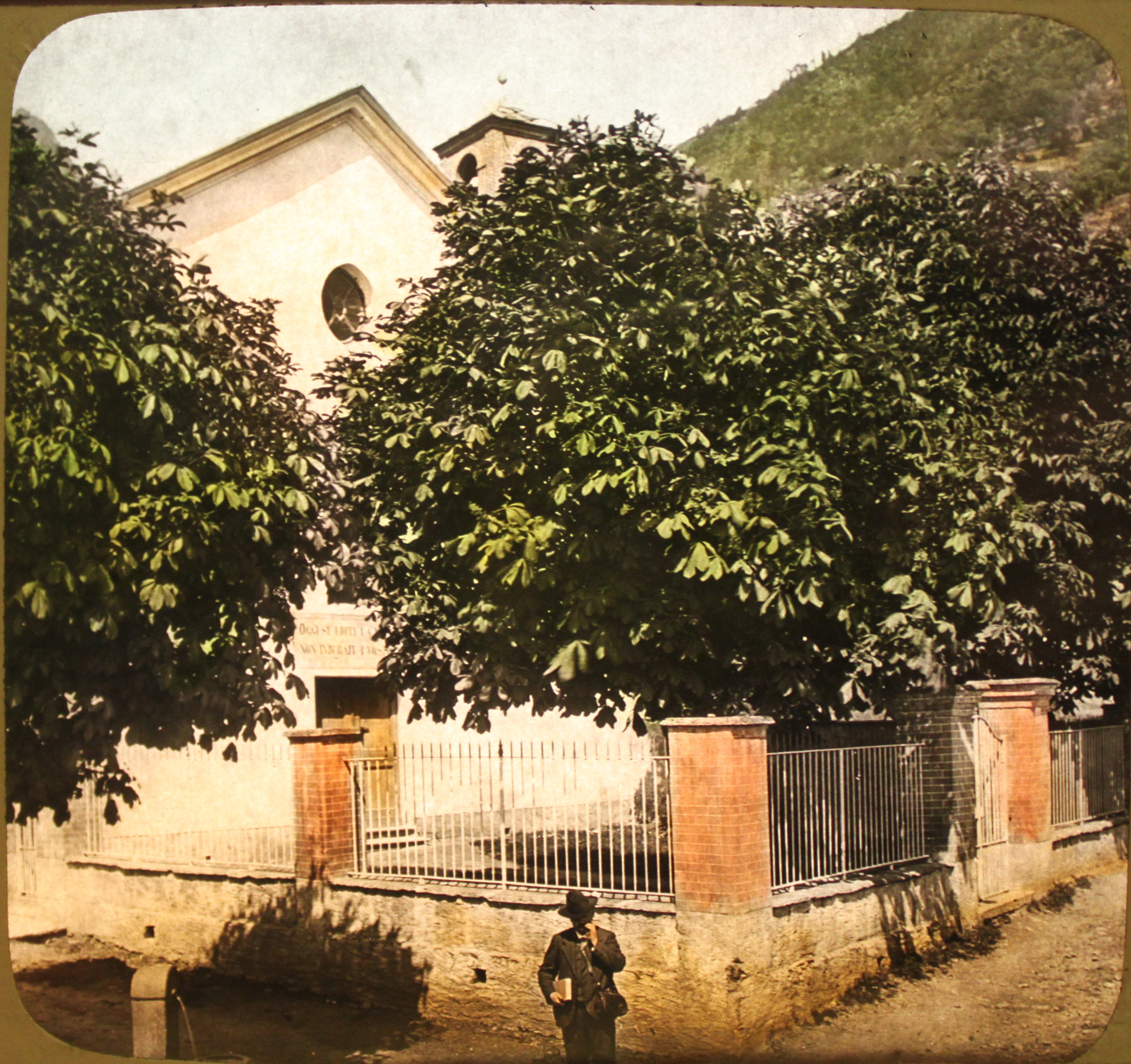
Waldensian Church at Bobbio 1895

- Giardino Botanico Alpino "Bruno Peyronel", an alpine botanical garden
- Monte Meidassa
- Monte Granero
