= Barssia peyronelii =

Scientific classification
- Kingdom: Fungi
- Division: Ascomycota
- Class: Pezizomycetes
- Order: Pezizales
- Family: Helvellaceae
- Genus: Barssia
- Species: B. peyronelii

Binomial name
- Barssia peyronelii (Mattir.) Agnello & Kaounas (2017)

Synonyms
- Stephensia peyronelii Mattir. (1936)

Species of fungus

Barssia peyronelii is a hypogeous (underground-growing) species of fungus from the genus Barssia. It is found in Italy.

== Taxonomy ==
Barssia peyronelii is a hypogeous (underground-growing) fungus in the order Pezizales. It was originally described as Stephensia peyronelii by Oreste Mattirolo in 1936, before being reclassified to the genus Barssia in 2017 by Carlo Agnello and Vasileios Kaounas based on microscopic examination of the holotype specimen.

== Description ==
The fruitbody of B. peyronelii (ascocarp) is small, approximately the size of a pea, and ranges from globose (spherical) to subglobose or irregularly shaped. The outer surface (peridium) is chestnut-brown to reddish-brown and covered with a very fine, cotton-like coating. The peridium consists of an outer pseudoparenchymatous layer 200–270 μm thick composed of thick-walled polygonal cells (25–40 by 10–30 μm) that are dark amber in colour, followed by an inner layer 150–200 μm thick of more compact fungal filaments with thinner walls. The fruitbody features a distinct basal depression or cavity. The internal spore-bearing tissue (gleba) is dirty white in colour with whitish, convoluted veins arranged in grape-like clusters. The gleba is formed by interwoven septate hyphae measuring 2– μm in diameter.

The reproductive structures include cylindrical, hyaline (translucent) paraphyses that are simple or forked, septate, and slightly longer than the spore-producing sacs (asci). The asci are irregularly clavate (club-shaped) or ellipsoid, thick-walled, with a distinctive protruding hump at the apex and a pleurorynchous (laterally rooted) base. They are inamyloid (not staining blue with iodine), contain eight spores each, and measure 150–190 by 30–45 μm.

The ascospores are ellipsoid, smooth, hyaline, and irregularly arranged within the asci. They measure 25–33 by 14–18 μm (averaging 28 by 16 μm), with a length-to-width ratio of 1.78–2.11 (average 1.93). The spores typically contain one or two large oil droplets and several smaller droplets.

== Distribution ==
Barssia peyronelii is primarily found in Northern Italy. It is associated with larch (Larix) trees and is considered host-specific. It was originally found at an elevation of 1400 metres above sea level near Rioclaretto in the Valle Perrero region of Piedmont, Italy.
