= Grand Queyron =

Mountain in Italy

Gran Queyron
- Grand Queyron
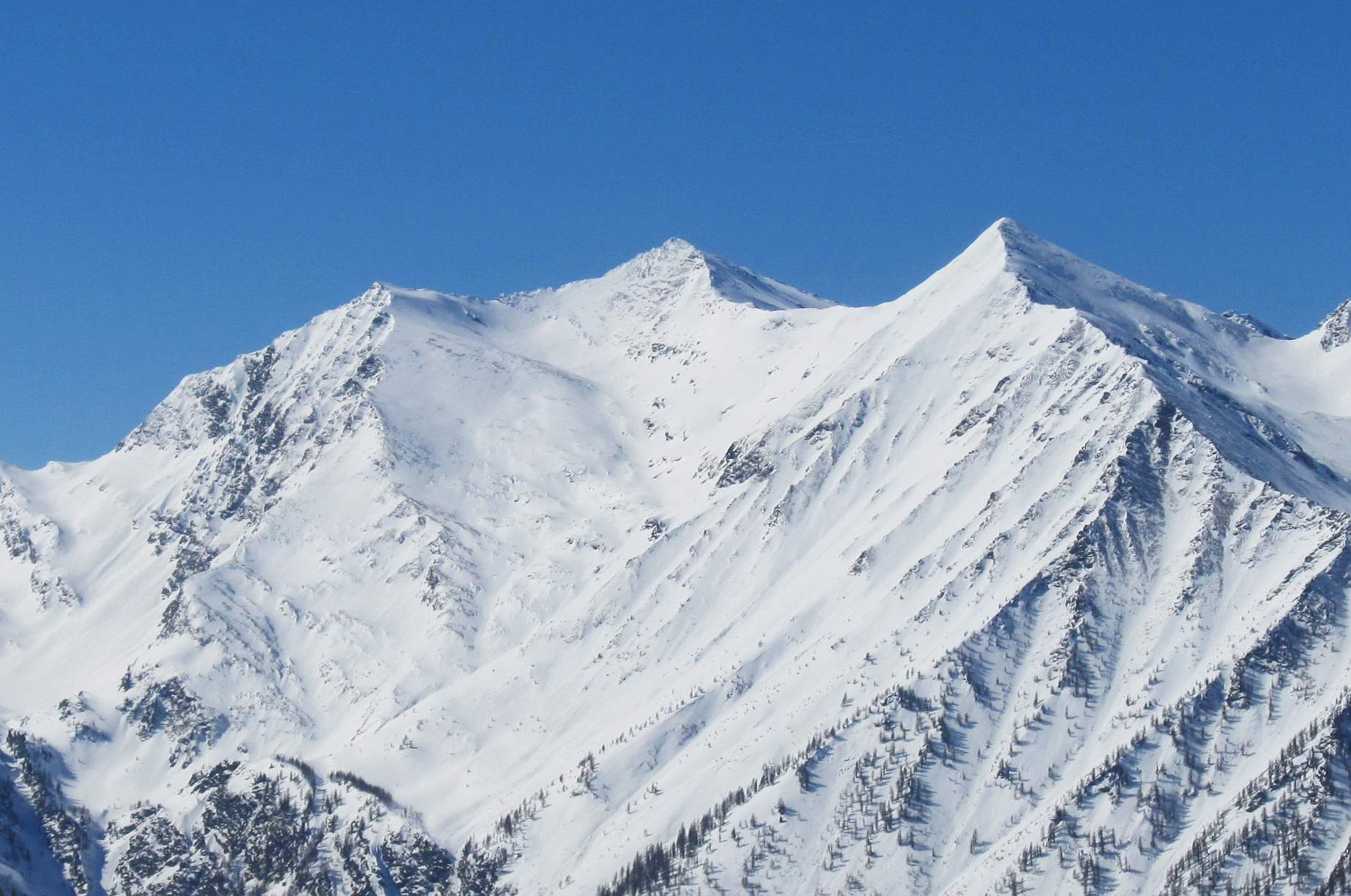
- Winter view of Gran Queyron with Cima Frappier to the right and punta Raisin on the left

Highest point
- Elevation: 3,060 m (10,040 ft)
- Prominence: 295 m (968 ft)
- Listing: Alpine mountains above 3000 m
- Coordinates: 44°50′36″N 7°00′02″E

Geography
- Location within Alps
- Location: Provence-Alpes-Côte d'Azur, France; Piemonte, Italy
- Parent range: Cottian Alps

Climbing
- Easiest route: Hike

The Gran Queyron (in Italian) or Grand Queyron (in French) is a 3,060 metres high mountain of the Cottian Alps.

== Toponymy ==
In the Italian alpinistic and geographic literature the mountain also appears as Gran Queyròn, Frapeyràs or Gran Zueyron.

== Geography ==
The peak is located on the French-Italian border between the Metropolitan City of Turin (Piedmont) and the French department of Hautes-Alpes (Provence-Alpes-Côte-d'Azur). It belongs to the Main chain of the Alps. Administratively the mountain is the tripoint where the Italian comunes of Sauze di Cesana (north-west face) and Prali (north-east face) meet with the French commune of Abriès (south face).

=== SOIUSA classification ===
According to SOIUSA (International Standardized Mountain Subdivision of the Alps) the mountain can be classified in the following way:

- main part = Western Alps
- major sector = South Western Alps
- section = Cottian Alps
- subsection = Central Cottian Alps
- supergroup = Catena Bucie-Grand Queyron-Orsiera
- group = Queyron-Albergian-Sestrière
- subgroup = Grand Queyron-Vergia-Rognosa
- code = I/A-4.II-A.2.a

== Access to the summit ==
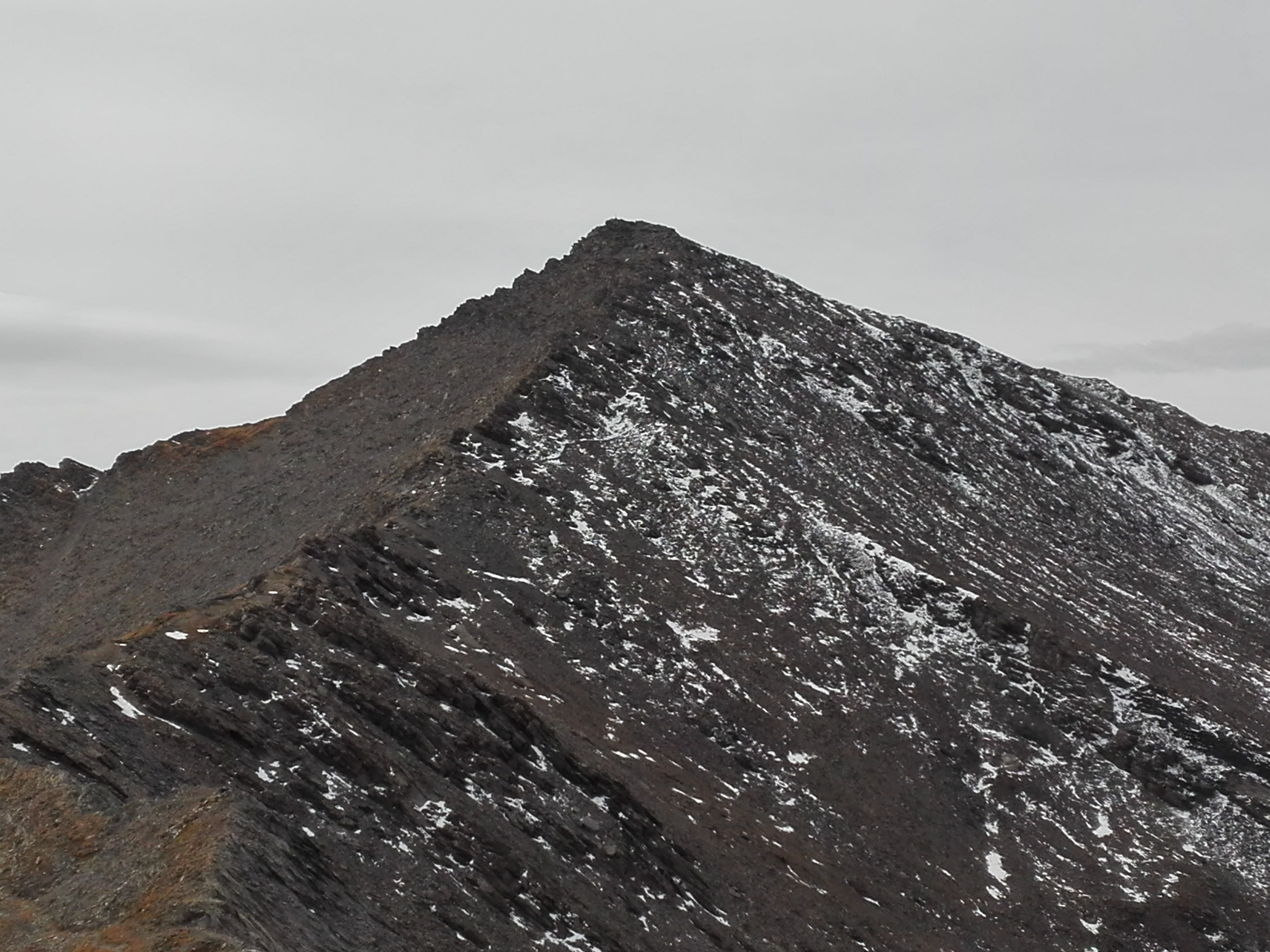
NE ridge.

The summit of the Gran Queyron can be accessed starting from the village of Bout du Col (Prali) by marked footpaths with some hiking experience. Another way follows the Argentera valley from Bergeria del Gran Miôl, which can be accessed with a 4 wheel drive vehicle. From there the climb to the summit takes a little less than 2.5 hours's walk.

== Maps ==
- Italian official cartography (Istituto Geografico Militare - IGM); on-line version: www.pcn.minambiente.it
- French official cartography (Institut géographique national - IGN); on-line version: www.geoportail.fr
- Istituto Geografico Centrale - Carta dei sentieri e dei rifugi scala 1:50.000 n. 1 Valli di Susa Chisone e Germanasca
