= Barssia =

Scientific classification
- Domain: Eukaryota
- Kingdom: Fungi
- Division: Ascomycota
- Class: Pezizomycetes
- Order: Pezizales
- Family: Helvellaceae
- Genus: Barssia; Gilkey (1925)

Type species
- Barssia oregonensis Gilkey (1925)

Species
- B. oregonensis B. yezomontana B. guozigouensis B. luyashanensis B. peyronelii B. gunerii B. maroccana B. hellenica

Synonyms
- Phymatomyces Kobayasi (1937)

Genus of fungi

Barssia is a genus of ascomycete fungi of the family Helvellaceae. The widespread genus contains two species.
