= Salza di Pinerolo =

Salza di Pinerolo Salsa
- Comune
- Comune di Salza di Pinerolo
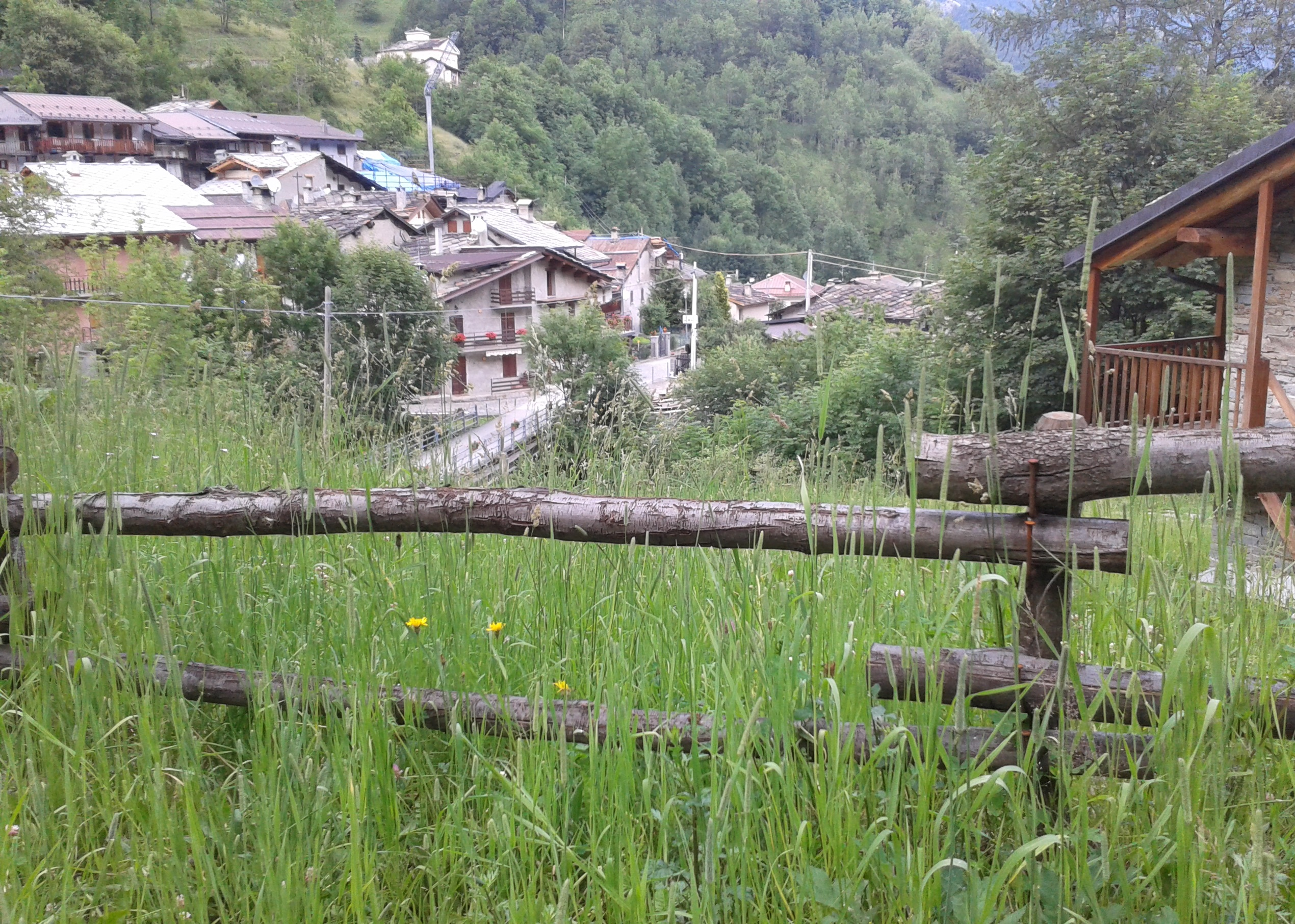

- Location within Italy Location within Piedmont
- Coordinates: 44°56′N 7°3′E
- Country: Italy
- Region: Piedmont
- Metropolitan city: Turin (TO)

Government
  - Mayor: Ezio Sanmartino

Area
  - Total: 15.89 km^{2} (6.14 sq mi)
- Elevation: 1,210 m (3,970 ft)

Population (2018-01-01)31 August 2021
  - Total: 74
  - Density: 4.7/km^{2} (12/sq mi)
- Demonym: Salsini
- Time zone: UTC+1 (CET)
  - Summer (DST): UTC+2 (CEST)
- Postal code: 10060
- Dialing code: 0121
- Website: Official website

Salza di Pinerolo (Vivaro-Alpine: Salsa, French: Salze-de-Pignerol) is a comune (municipality) in the Metropolitan City of Turin in the Italian region Piedmont, located about 50 kilometres (31 mi) southwest of Turin.

Salza di Pinerolo borders the following municipalities: Pragelato, Massello, Perrero, and Prali.
