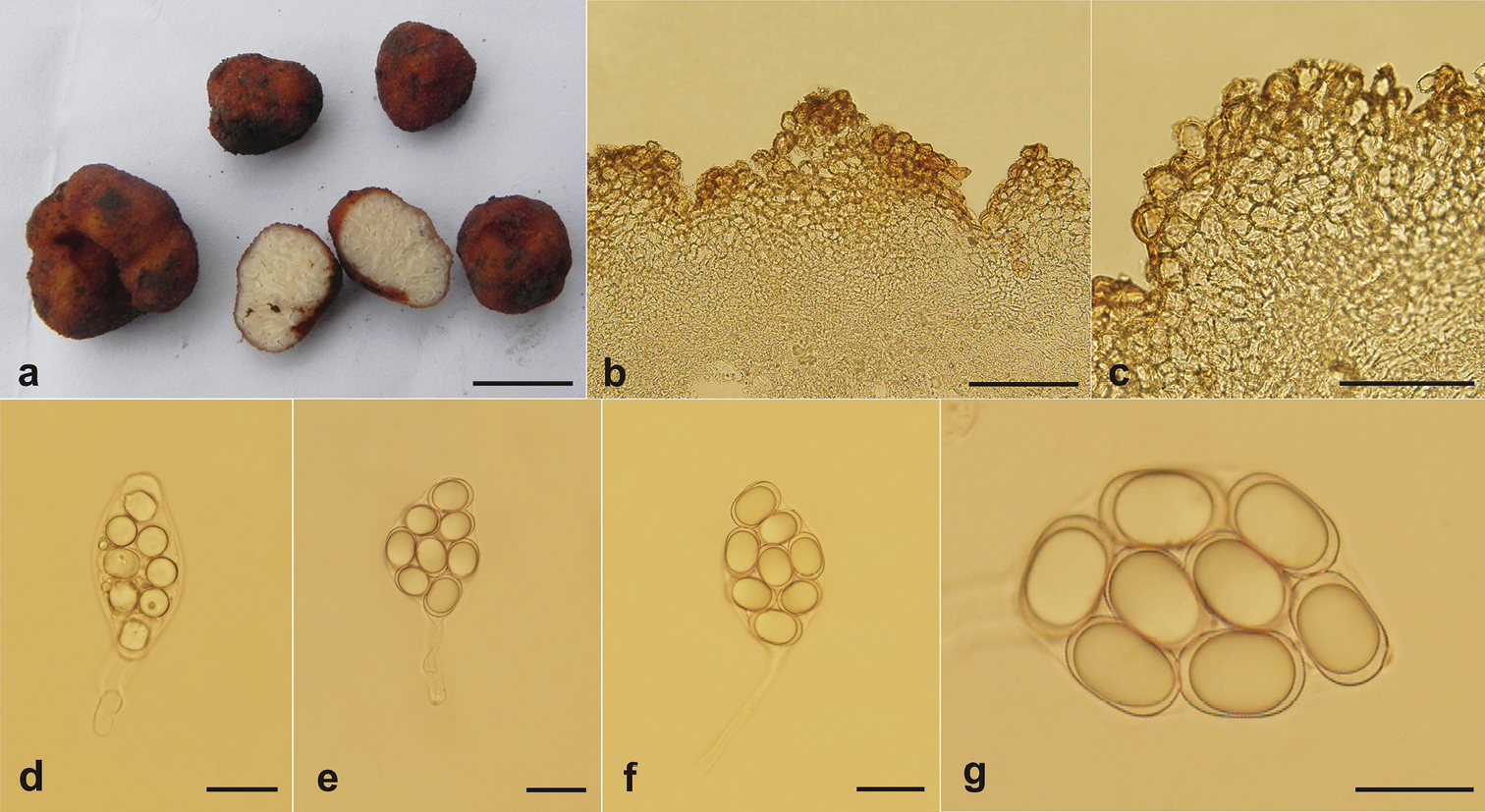
- Balsamia platyspora

Scientific classification
- Domain: Eukaryota
- Kingdom: Fungi
- Division: Ascomycota
- Class: Pezizomycetes
- Order: Pezizales
- Family: Helvellaceae
- Genus: Balsamia; Vittad. (1831)

Type species
- Balsamia vulgaris Vittad. (1831)

Species
- See text

Synonyms
- Pseudobalsamia E.Fisch. (1907)

= Balsamia =

Genus of fungi

Balsamia is a genus of truffle-like ascomycete fungi of the family Helvellaceae. The widespread genus contains twenty five species known from Europe, North America, North Africa and Asia, including China.

== Species ==
The following is the list of accepted species:

- Balsamia aestivalis (R.Heim & L.Rémy) K.Hansen, Skrede & T.Schumach.
- Balsamia alba Harkn.
- Balsamia ambigua Petitb.
- Balsamia cascadensis D.Southw., J.L.Frank & Castellano
- Balsamia filamentosa Harkn.
- Balsamia fragiformis Tul. & C.Tul.
- Balsamia fusispora Schulzer
- Balsamia gunerii (H.H.Doğan, Bozok & Taşkin) K.Hansen & X.H.Wang
- Balsamia guozigouensis (L.Fan & Y.Y.Xu) L.Fan & Y.Y.Xu
- Balsamia hellenica (Kaounas, Agnello, P.Alvarado & Slavova) K.Hansen & X.H.Wang
- Balsamia latispora D.Southw., J.L.Frank & Castellano
- Balsamia lazyana Trappe, D.Southw. & Amaranthus
- Balsamia limuwensis D.Southw., J.L.Frank & Castellano
- Balsamia lishanensis L.Fan & Y.Y.Xu
- Balsamia luyashanensis (L.Fan & Y.Y.Xu) L.Fan & Y.Y.Xu
- Balsamia magnata Harkn.
- Balsamia maroccana (G.Moreno, Manjón, Carlavilla & P.Alvarado) K.Hansen & X.H.Wang
- Balsamia nigrans Harkn.
- Balsamia oblonga Koh.Yamam., N.Endo, Ohmae & Orihara
- Balsamia oregonensis (Gilkey) K.Hansen & X.H.Wang
- Balsamia pallida D.Southw., J.L.Frank & Castellano
- Balsamia platyspora Berk.
- Balsamia platyspora Berk.Ann.Mag.Nat.Hist
- Balsamia polysperma Vittad.
- Balsamia quercicola D.Southw., M.E.Sm. & J.L.Frank
- Balsamia setchellii (E.Fisch.) Trappe, D.Southw. & Castellano
- Balsamia trappei D.Southw., J.L.Frank & Castellano
- Balsamia vulgaris Vittad.
