= Barssia guozigouensis =

Scientific classification
- Domain: Eukaryota
- Kingdom: Fungi
- Division: Ascomycota
- Class: Pezizomycetes
- Order: Pezizales
- Family: Helvellaceae
- Genus: Barssia
- Species: B. guozigouensis

Binomial name
- Barssia guozigouensis Gilkey

Species of fungus

Barssia guozigouensis is a species of fungus from the genus Barssia.

== Description ==
Barssia guozigouensis has a finely bumpy, and dark brown exterior. The interior is tan with comparatively large wrinkles to the size of the fungus.

== Distribution ==
Barssia guozigouensis is primarily found in Western Europe on the border between France and Switzerland. It has also been located in China.
