= Barssia yezomontana =

Scientific classification
- Domain: Eukaryota
- Kingdom: Fungi
- Division: Ascomycota
- Class: Pezizomycetes
- Order: Pezizales
- Family: Helvellaceae
- Genus: Barssia
- Species: B. yezomontana

Binomial name
- Barssia yezomontana Gilkey

Species of fungus

Barssia yezomontana is a species of fungus from the genus Barssia. First described by Kobayasi in 1938.

== Distribution ==
Barssia yezomontana is primarily found in Northern Japan, it was originally found in Yezo (Hokkaido).
