= Angrogna =

- Comune
- Comune di Angrogna
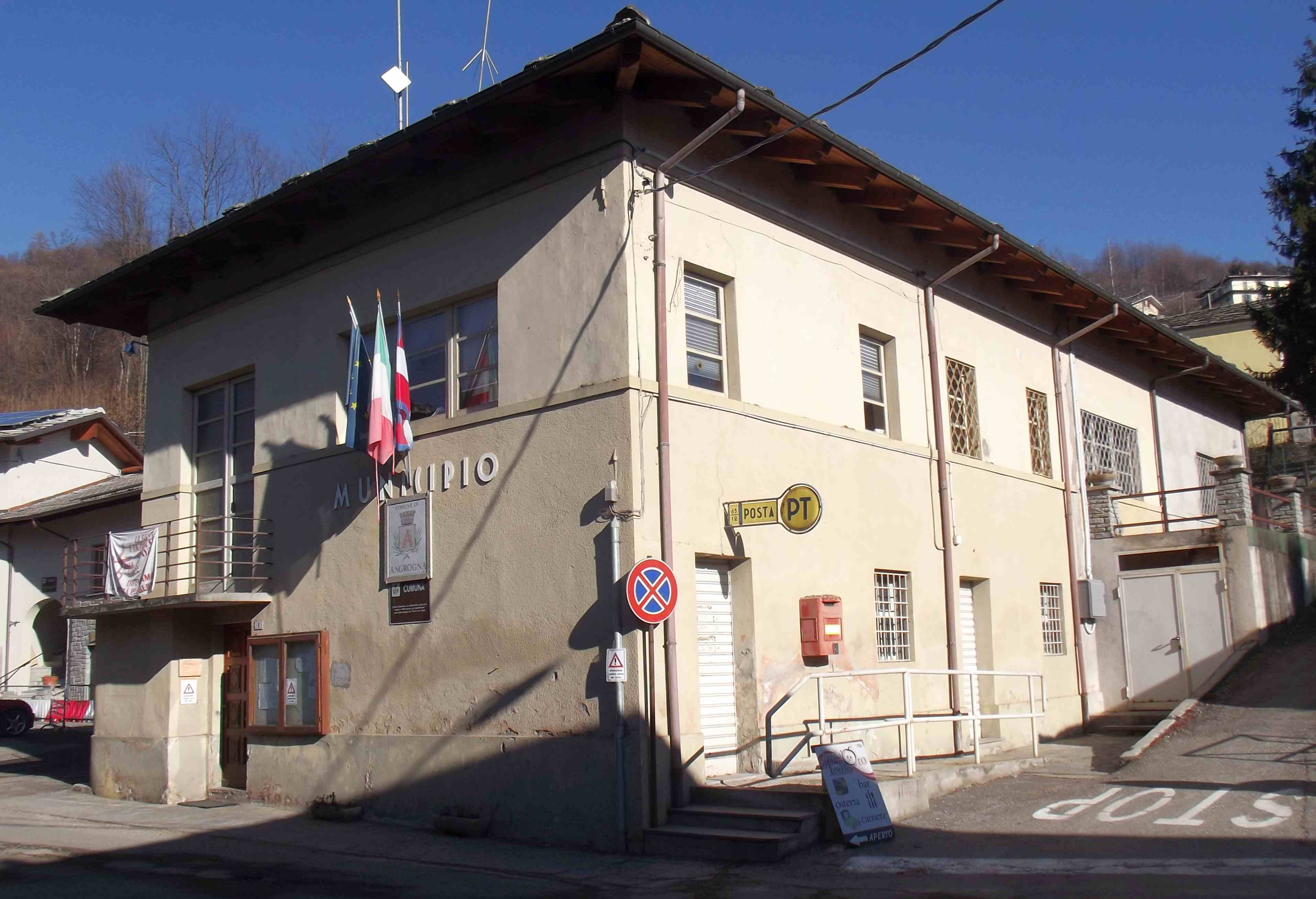
- Comune of Angrogna

- Coat of arms

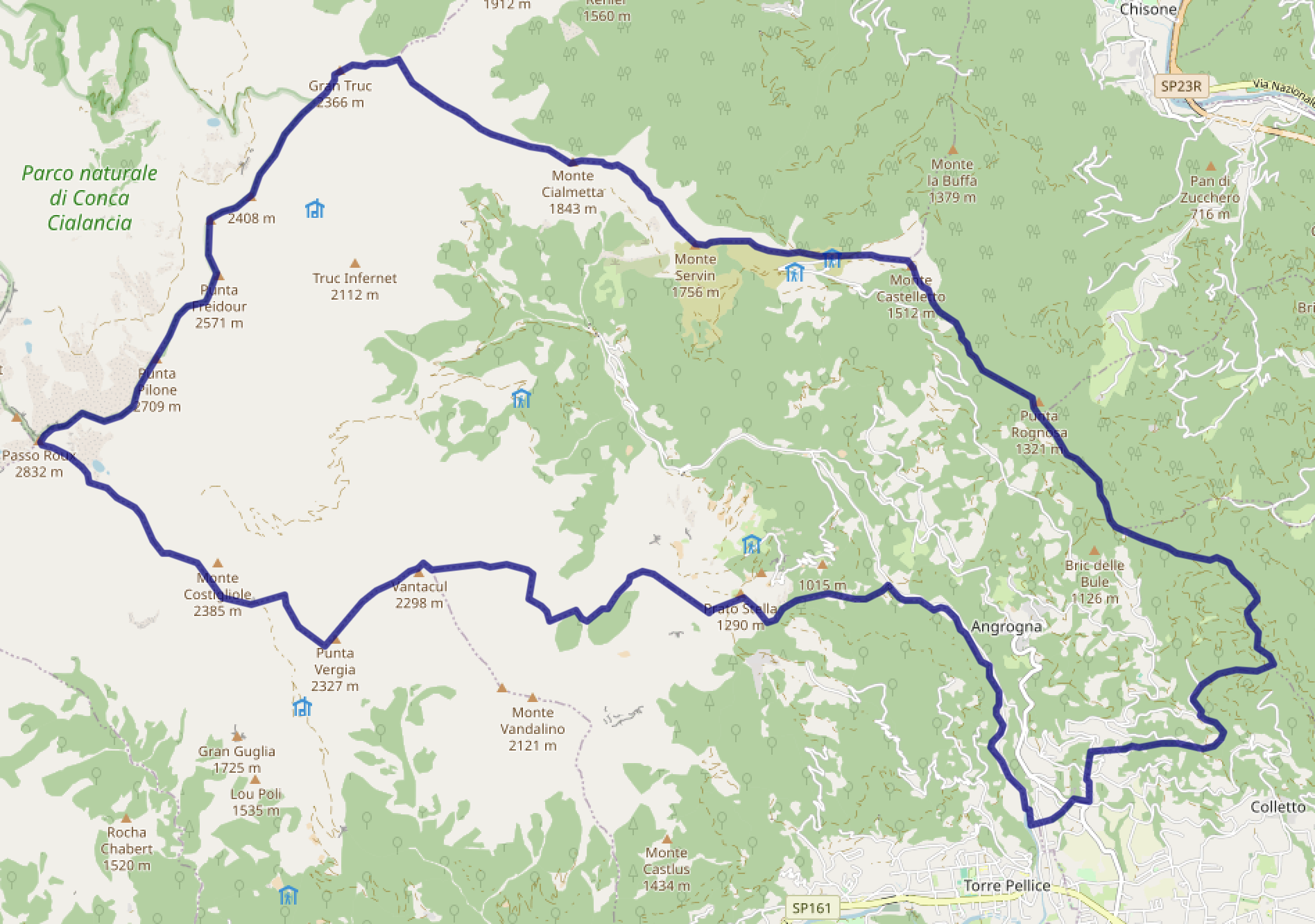

- Location of Angrogna in Italy Angrogna (Piedmont)
- Coordinates: 44°51′N 7°13′E
- Country: Italy
- Region: Piedmont
- Metropolitan city: Turin (TO)
- Frazioni: Baussan, Martel, Pradeltorno, Serre

Government
  - Mayor: Mario Malan

Area
  - Total: 38.88 km^{2} (15.01 sq mi)
- Elevation: 782 m (2,566 ft)

Population (1-1-2017)
  - Total: 886
  - Density: 22.8/km^{2} (59.0/sq mi)
- Demonym: Angrognino(i)
- Time zone: UTC+1 (CET)
  - Summer (DST): UTC+2 (CEST)
- Postal code: 10060
- Dialing code: 0121

Angrogna (Piedmontese: Angreugna, Occitan: Angruenha) is a comune (municipality) in the Metropolitan City of Turin in the Italian region Piedmont, located about 45 kilometres (28 mi) southwest of Turin.

Angrogna borders the following municipalities: Perrero, Prali, Pramollo, San Germano Chisone, Prarostino, Villar Pellice, Bricherasio, Torre Pellice, and Luserna San Giovanni.

== Waldensian presence ==
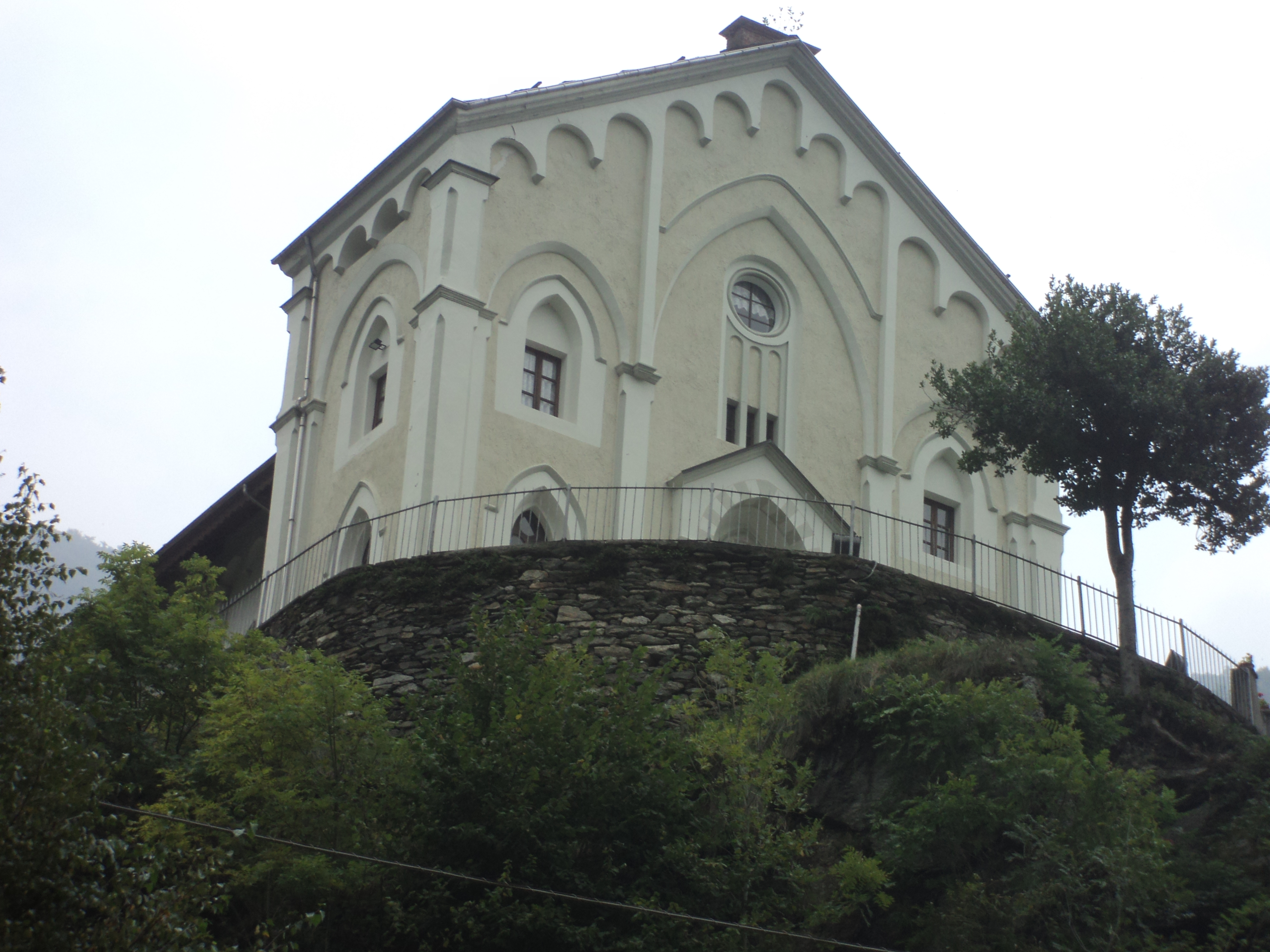
the waldensian temple in Pra del torno.

The valley of Angrogna, Val di Angrogna, situated in the Cottian Alps between Piedmont and France has historic significance for the Waldensian Church. A narrow Alpine valley starting in Val Pellice, the valley of Angrogna ends at the village of Pra del Torno which was the location of a Waldensian mission centre during The Middle Ages. Due to its narrowness, the valley was a military and religious refuge for the Waldensians and Pra del Torno were the centre of Waldensian resistance from the 13th to the 18th centuries. As evidence of their persecutions, there is still a sort of catacomb located near the village of San Lorenzo.

In pre-Reformation times Waldensian missionaries were trained in a college at Pra del Torno by 'barbes', their pastors, to work as traders spreading their message across Europe. The ruins of this college still exist. There are both Catholic and Waldensian churches today situated at Pra del Torno, as well as in a number of other villages in the valley.

Angrona was selected as the Waldensian refuge from Papal armies under Papal legate, Cataneo in 1488. Cataneo was charged by a Papal Bull to destroy the 'heretic' populations of the Waldensian valleys but the Waldensians defenders were able to repel the Papal troops' just outside Pra del Torno and protect their main population in the village from massacre. In 1532, at Chanforan in Angrogna, a Waldensian synod of churches in France, Calabria and Apulia took the decision that the Waldensian Church should join the Protestant Reformation which their doctrines had prefigured.

The Waldensians in Angrogna suffered fierce persecutions throughout the 17th century but were supported by Oliver Cromwell and William of Orange. In 1686, Victor Amadeus II, in accordance with the policy of Louis XIV of France, began the systematic expulsion of the Waldensian valleys. Local troops destroyed the houses of Waldensians and their land in the valley was expropriated and sold to Catholics coming from elsewhere in Piedmont. After reconciling with Victor Amadeus, the Waldensians returned to their land and homes in the valley. Charles Albert of Savoy gave the Waldenses freedom to worship, in February 1848.

In the 19th century, British supporters of the Waldensians, who funded the Waldensian headquarters in nearby Torre Pellice founded a primary school for Waldensian children living in Angrogna.

== People ==
- Willy Bertin (b. 1944), ski mountaineer and biathlete

== Sources ==
- James Aitken Wylie, History of the Waldenses
