= Monte Meidassa =

Mountain in Italy

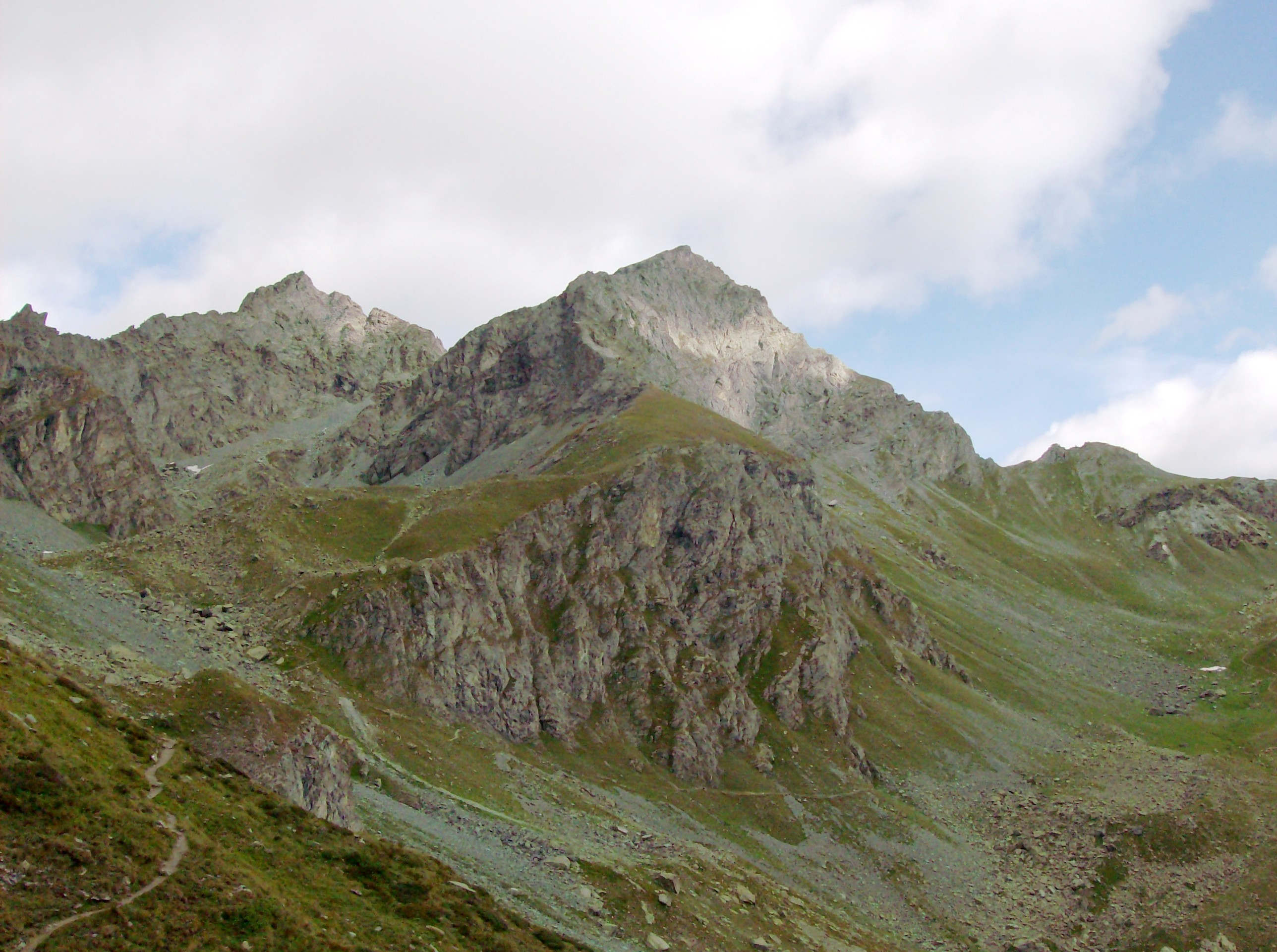
- Monte Meidassa with, on the left background, the Monte Granero

Highest point
- Elevation: 3,105 m (10,187 ft)
- Prominence: 86 m (282 ft)
- Isolation: 0.4 km (0.25 mi)
- Coordinates: 44°43′09″N 07°04′20″E

Geography
- Location within Alps
- Location: Piedmont, Italy
- Parent range: Cottian Alps

Climbing
- Easiest route: from Pian del Re (Crissolo)

Monte Meidassa is a peak in the Cottian Alps, in western Piedmont, northern Italy. The slightly higher Monte Granero is located nearby.

== Geography ==
Administratively it is divided between the Metropolitan City of Turin and the province of Cuneo, both in the Piedmont region. Included in the comuni of Crissolo and Bobbio Pellice, not far from the boundary with France, it has an elevation of 3,105 m. It separates the Valle Pellice and the Valle Po.

== SOIUSA classification ==
According to the SOIUSA (International Standardized Mountain Subdivision of the Alps) the mountain can be classified in the following way:

- main part = Western Alps
- major sector = South Western Alps
- section = Cottian Alps
- subsection = southern Cottian Alps
- supergroup = catena Aiguillette-Monviso-Granero
- group = gruppo Granero-Frioland
- subgroup = gruppo del Monte Granero
- code = I/A-4.I-C.9.a
