= Perrero =

Perrero Lo Perrier
- Comune
- Comune di Perrero
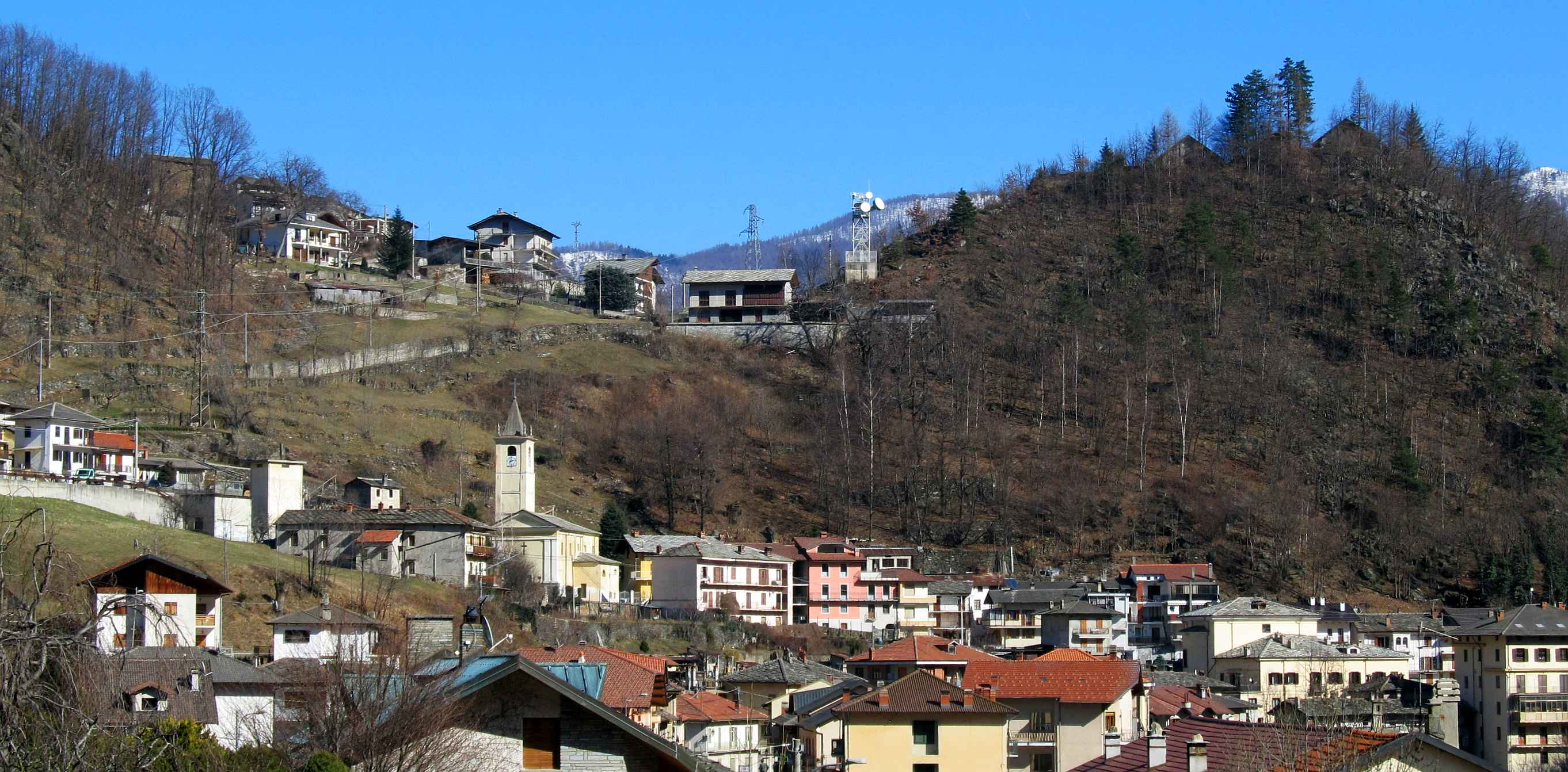
- Panorama

- Location within Italy Location within Piedmont
- Coordinates: 44°56′N 7°07′E
- Country: Italy
- Region: Piedmont
- Metropolitan city: Turin (TO)
- Frazioni: Combagarino, Trossieri, Traverse, San Martino, Chiabrano, Vrocchi, Linsard, Villasecca Inferiore, Villasecca Superiore, Peyrone

Government
  - Mayor: Laura Richaud

Area
  - Total: 63.18 km^{2} (24.39 sq mi)

Population (31 August 2021)
  - Total: 585
  - Density: 9.26/km^{2} (24.0/sq mi)
- Time zone: UTC+1 (CET)
  - Summer (DST): UTC+2 (CEST)
- Postal code: 10060
- Dialing code: 0121

Perrero (Occitan: Lo Perrier; French: Le Perrier) is a comune (municipality) in the Metropolitan City of Turin in the Italian region Piedmont, located about 40 kilometres (25 mi) southwest of Turin.

Perrero borders the following municipalities: Roure, Perosa Argentina, Massello, Pomaretto, Salza di Pinerolo, Prali, Pramollo, Angrogna, and Villar Pellice.

== History ==
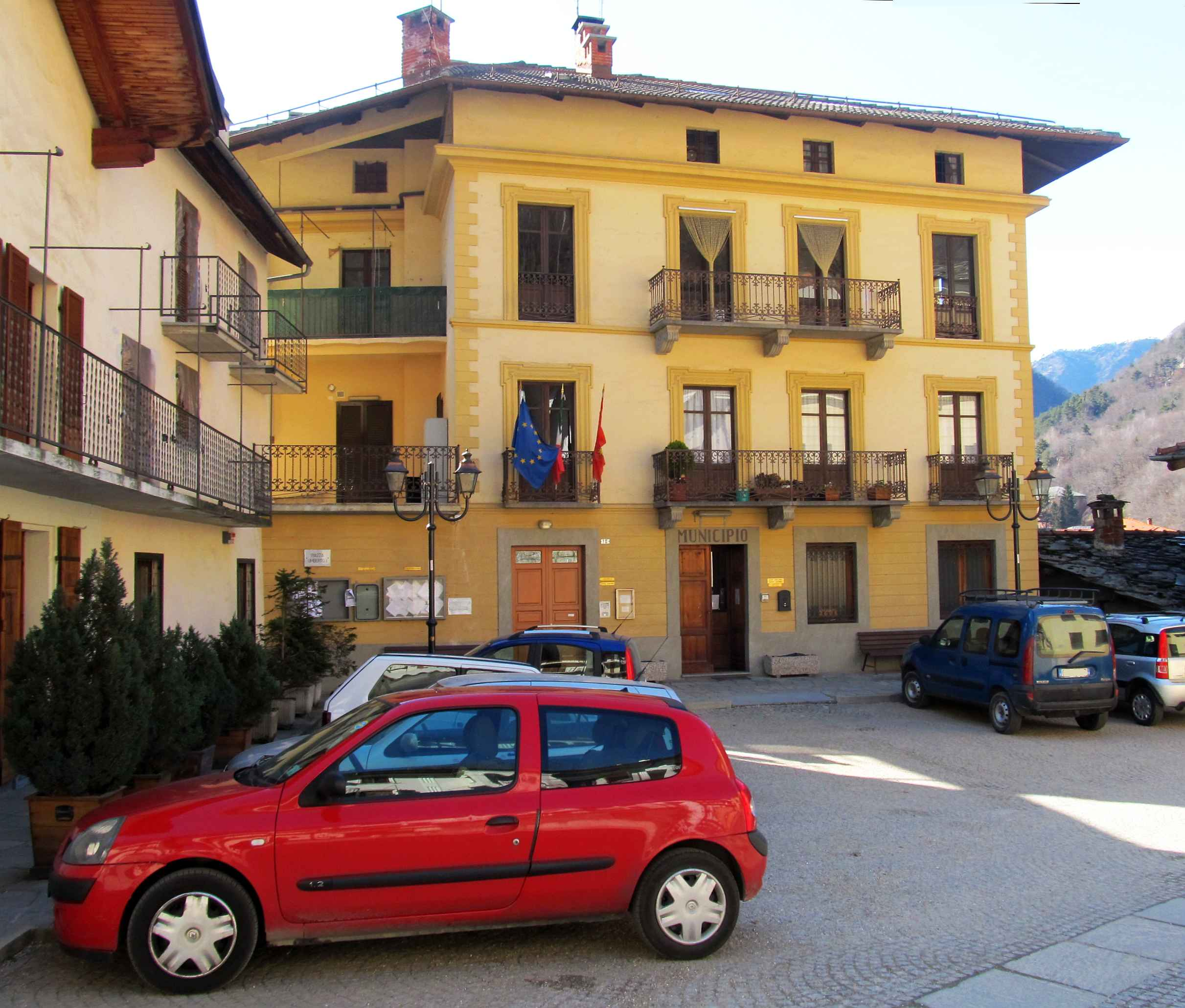
City hall

In 1928, the Mussolini regime annexed to Perrero seven other communes (Bovile, Chiabrano, Faetto, Maniglia, Riclaretto, San Martino di Perrero and Traverse).
