= Villar Pellice =

Villar Pellice Lo Vilar de Pèlis
- Comune
- Comune di Villar Pellice
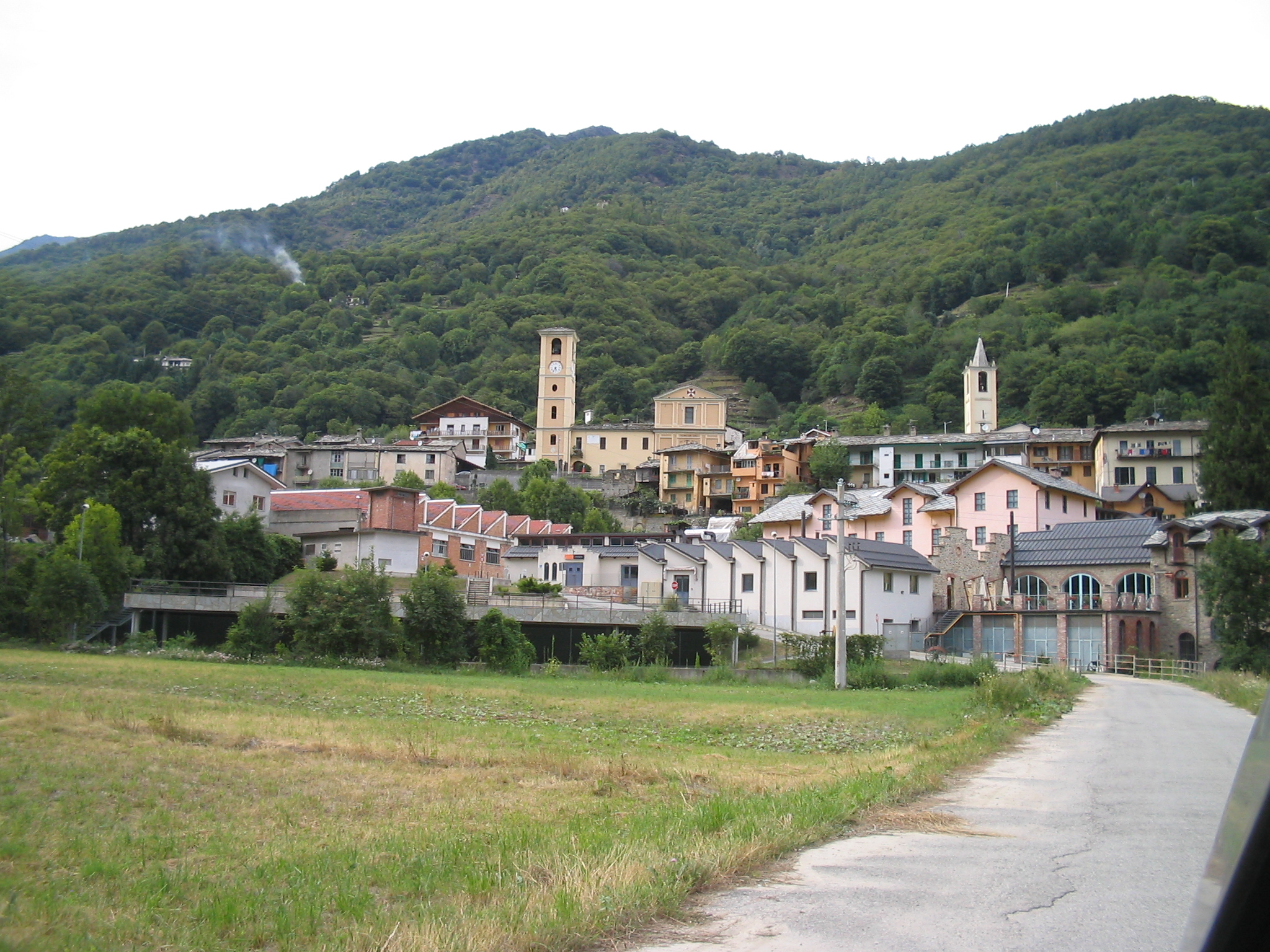

- Location within Italy Location within Piedmont
- Coordinates: 44°48′N 7°10′E
- Country: Italy
- Region: Piedmont
- Metropolitan city: Turin (TO)

Area
  - Total: 60.9 km^{2} (23.5 sq mi)

Population (Dec. 2004)
  - Total: 1,213
  - Density: 19.9/km^{2} (51.6/sq mi)
- Demonym: Villaresi
- Time zone: UTC+1 (CET)
  - Summer (DST): UTC+2 (CEST)
- Postal code: 10060
- Dialing code: 0121

Villar Pellice (Vivaro-Alpine: Lo Vilar de Pèlis) is a comune (municipality) in the Metropolitan City of Turin in the Italian region Piedmont, located about 50 kilometres (31 mi) southwest of Turin. As of 31 December 2004, it had a population of 1,213 and an area of 60.9 square kilometres (23.5 mi^{2}).

Villar Pellice borders the following municipalities: Perrero, Prali, Angrogna, Bobbio Pellice, Torre Pellice, Rorà, Bagnolo Piemonte, and Crissolo.

== Demographic evolution ==
Historical population

Year	Pop.	±%
1861	2,417	—
1871	2,139	−11.5%
1881	2,175	+1.7%
1901	1,888	−13.2%
1911	1,817	−3.8%

Year	Pop.	±%
1921	1,791	−1.4%
1931	1,743	−2.7%
1936	1,620	−7.1%
1951	1,471	−9.2%
1961	1,304	−11.4%

Year	Pop.	±%
1971	1,252	−4.0%
1981	1,219	−2.6%
1991	1,207	−1.0%
2001	1,187	−1.7%

Source: Data from ISTAT
