= Bagnolo Piemonte =

Bagnolo Piemonte Banhuel Bagneul
- Comune
- Comune di Bagnolo Piemonte
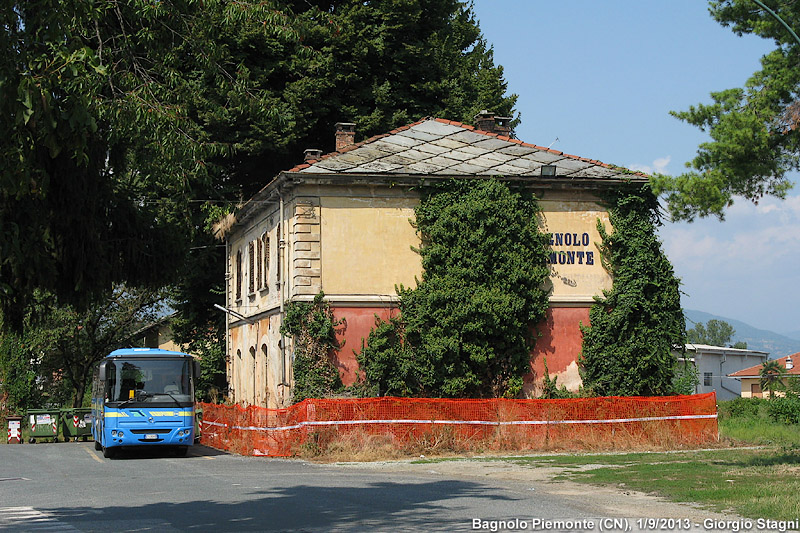

- Location within Italy Location within Piedmont
- Coordinates: 44°46′N 7°19′E
- Country: Italy
- Region: Piedmont
- Province: Cuneo (CN)

Government
  - Mayor: Fabio Bruno Franco

Area
  - Total: 63.16 km^{2} (24.39 sq mi)
- Elevation: 365 m (1,198 ft)

Population (30 November 2017)
  - Total: 5,981
  - Density: 94.70/km^{2} (245.3/sq mi)
- Demonym: Bagnolesi
- Time zone: UTC+1 (CET)
  - Summer (DST): UTC+2 (CEST)
- Postal code: 12031
- Dialing code: 0175
- Website: Official website

Bagnolo Piemonte (Occitan Banhuel, Piedmontese and French Bagneul) is a comune (municipality) in the Province of Cuneo in the Italian region Piedmont, located about 45 kilometres (28 mi) southwest of Turin and about 45 kilometres (28 mi) northwest of Cuneo. The ski resort and village Rucas is within the commune.

Bagnolo Piemonte borders the following municipalities: Barge, Bibiana, Cavour, Crissolo, Luserna San Giovanni, Ostana, Rorà, and Villar Pellice.
