= Rucas =

- Frazione
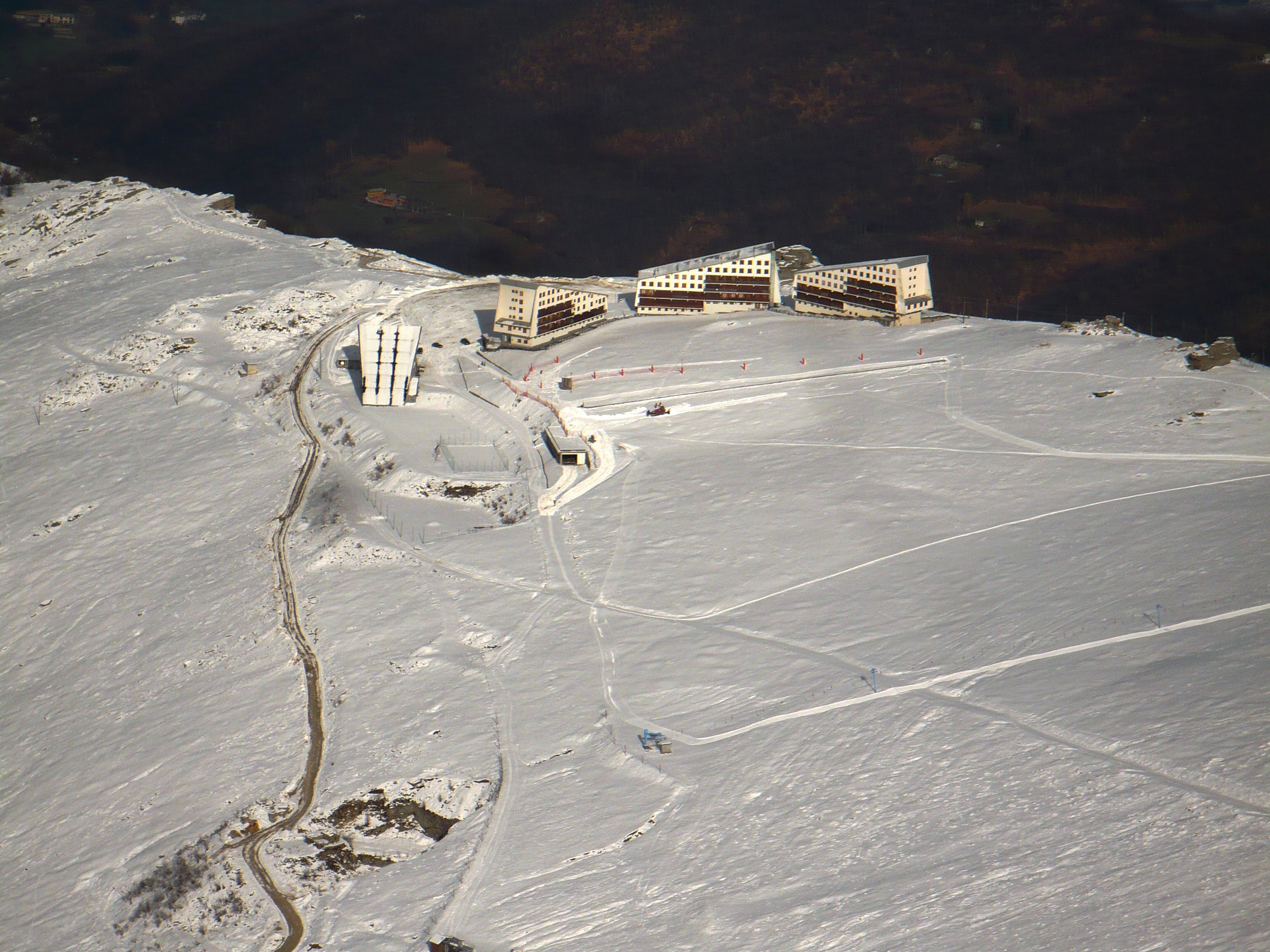

- Location of Rucas in Italy
- Coordinates: 44°45′12″N 07°12′09″E
- Country: Italy
- Region: Piedmont
- Province: Cuneo
- Comune: Bagnolo Piemonte
- Elevation: 1,530 m (5,020 ft)
- Time zone: UTC+1 (CET)
  - Summer (DST): UTC+2 (CEST)
- Postal code: 12031
- Dialing code: 0175
- Website: http://www.rucas.net/

Rucas is an Italian ski resort and village in the municipality of Bagnolo Piemonte, in Piedmont.
