= Balsamia luyashanensis =

Scientific classification
- Domain: Eukaryota
- Kingdom: Fungi
- Division: Ascomycota
- Class: Pezizomycetes
- Order: Pezizales
- Family: Helvellaceae
- Genus: Balsamia
- Species: B. luyashanensis

Binomial name
- Balsamia luyashanensis (L.Fan & Y.Y.Xu) L.Fan & Y.Y.Xu

Species of fungus

Balsamia luyashanensis is a species of fungus from the genus Balsamia. It was previously placed in the genus Barssia.
