= Synod of Chanforan =

The Waldensian (Vaudois) Synod of Chanforan took place in 1532, in the Val d’Angrogne, in the Italian Piedmont.

== History ==
During the Synod of Chanforan, the Waldensians decided to print a French version of the Bible and join the Reformation movement. Printing was still in its infancy; most printers were Protestant.

This assembly brought together "barbes" (barbers), who earned their living as itinerant Waldensian preachers, from various regions such as Apulia, Provence, Piedmont, Germany, and communities scattered throughout Europe.

The Synod began on 12 September 1532 in the locality of Chanforan in the current municipality of Angrogna. The synod lasted six days. The use of the term "synod" in relation to this event is disputed by some authors since at that time the Waldensian Church did not yet exist in a structured form; in fact, it began to assume an organised structure only from the mid-16th century. Subsequent synods would take on the characteristics of annual legislative assemblies of ministers of worship and lay people, called to deliberate on the governance of the Waldensian Church.

Among the results achieved by the general assembly were three main components: the adhesion of the Waldensians to the Swiss Reformed Church (aligning themselves in particular with the positions of Huldrych Zwingli, Martin Bucer and Johannes Oecolampadius), smoothing out or eliminating several original medieval connotations of Waldensianism; the approval of the twenty articles defining the doctrine of the Church; and thirdly the decision to translate the Bible into the current language used by the faithful, namely French (from this decision the so-called Olivetan Bible would later derive, that is the translation made by Pierre Robert Olivétan and published in 1535). The influential theologian Guillaume Farel, who had a leading role in defining the doctrine of the Waldensian Church, was also present at the Chanforan assembly. The confession of faith of the Synod of Chanforan began to be published in the official texts produced by the Waldensian Church from the 17th century onwards and is based on a document currently preserved at Trinity College, Dublin, Ms. 259.

In the historiographical field, although the prevailing position is that of those who see the Synod of Chanforan as a historically proven event with decisive consequences on the evolution of Waldensianism, there are however discordant positions that tend to minimize the actual significance of the decisions resulting from this assembly or even to deny altogether that it ever took place, downgrading it to a myth constructed a posteriori.

== Bibliography ==
- Audisio, Gabriel (2006). Preachers by Night. The Waldensian Barbes (15th–16th Centuries). Brill.
- Audisio, Gabriel (1999). The Waldensian Dissent. Persecution and Survival, c.1170–c.1570. Cambridge University Press.
- Cameron, Euan (1984). The Reformation of the Heretics. The Waldenses of the Alps, 1480-1580. Oxford.
- Walsham, Alexandra; Cummings, Brian; Law, Ceri; Riley (a cura di), Karis (2020). Remembering the Reformation. Routledge.
- Stephens, Prescot (1998). The Waldensian Story: A Study in Faith, Intolerance and Survival. Book Guild Limited.
- Tucker, Jameson (2017). The Construction of Reformed Identity in Jean Crespin's Livre des Martyrs: All The True Christians. Routledge.
- Platone, Giuseppe (2014). Valdesi e Riforma nel passaggio di Chanforan (1532) (PDF). Claudiana.
