= Union of Free Evangelical Churches in France =

French religious organization

The Union of Free Evangelical Churches in France or the Union des Eglises évangéliques libres de France is an Evangelical Christian denomination. EFCC is an affiliate of the International Federation of Free Evangelical Churches.

== History ==
It was founded on September 1, 1849. Most churches were previously independent, which grew out of the revival between 1820 and 1830. A few were Reformed which left the Protestant State Church because of doctrinal confusion.

In 2017, it had 49 congregations.

The Apostles Creed and Nicene Creed are the standards. It has semi-Synodal church government. There are women ordinations.
