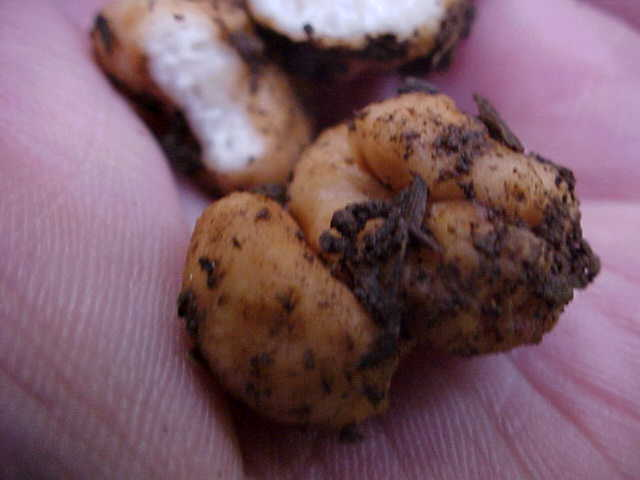
- Barssia oregonensis being held

Scientific classification
- Kingdom: Fungi
- Division: Ascomycota
- Class: Pezizomycetes
- Order: Pezizales
- Family: Helvellaceae
- Genus: Balsamia
- Species: B. oregonensis

Binomial name
- Balsamia oregonensis (Gilkey) K.Hansen & X.H.Wang

Synonyms
- Barssia oregonensis Gilkey

= Balsamia oregonensis =

Species of fungus

Balsamia oregonensis is a species of ascomycete fungus in the family Helvellaceae. It is commonly found in Oregon, which it is named for.

== Taxonomy ==
Balsamia oregonensis was first described by Helen Gilkey in 1925, who named it in honor of Professor H. P. Barss who first collected B. oregonensis in Oregon.

While originally assigned to genus Barssia, this species was reclassified along with much of Barssiainto the Balsamia genus.

== Description ==
Balsamia oregonensis is reddish-yellow in color and between 1 and 2.5 centimetres (1/2 and 1 in) across. Its exterior is roundish to somewhat flat and usually slightly lobed. It has fewer distinct warts than most other truffles. The entirety of the exterior is covered in coarse hyphae. The interior of B. oregonensis consists of whitish-gray canals.

Balsamia oregonensis releases its fungal spores seasonally in the spring and into early summertime.

== Distribution and habitat ==
As its name suggests, B. oregonensis is primarily found in Oregon, United States, although it is not exclusive to the area. Other areas within the United States where the species can be found includes the Great Plains region.

B. oregonensis has reportedly also been found in the Polish Tatra Mountains.

== Ecology ==
Balsamia oregonensis is commonly found alongside Douglas-fir trees which are considered its primary host. This association is useful in truffling and the best way to locate B. oregonensis in the wild.

There is evidence that B. oregonensis is seasonally consumed by wild animals, such as chipmunks, within its ecosystem.

== Uses ==
Balsamia oregonensis is an edible species of truffle and is described as having a pleasant taste. Distribution is considered infrequent to rare.
