= Monte Granero =

Mountain in Italy

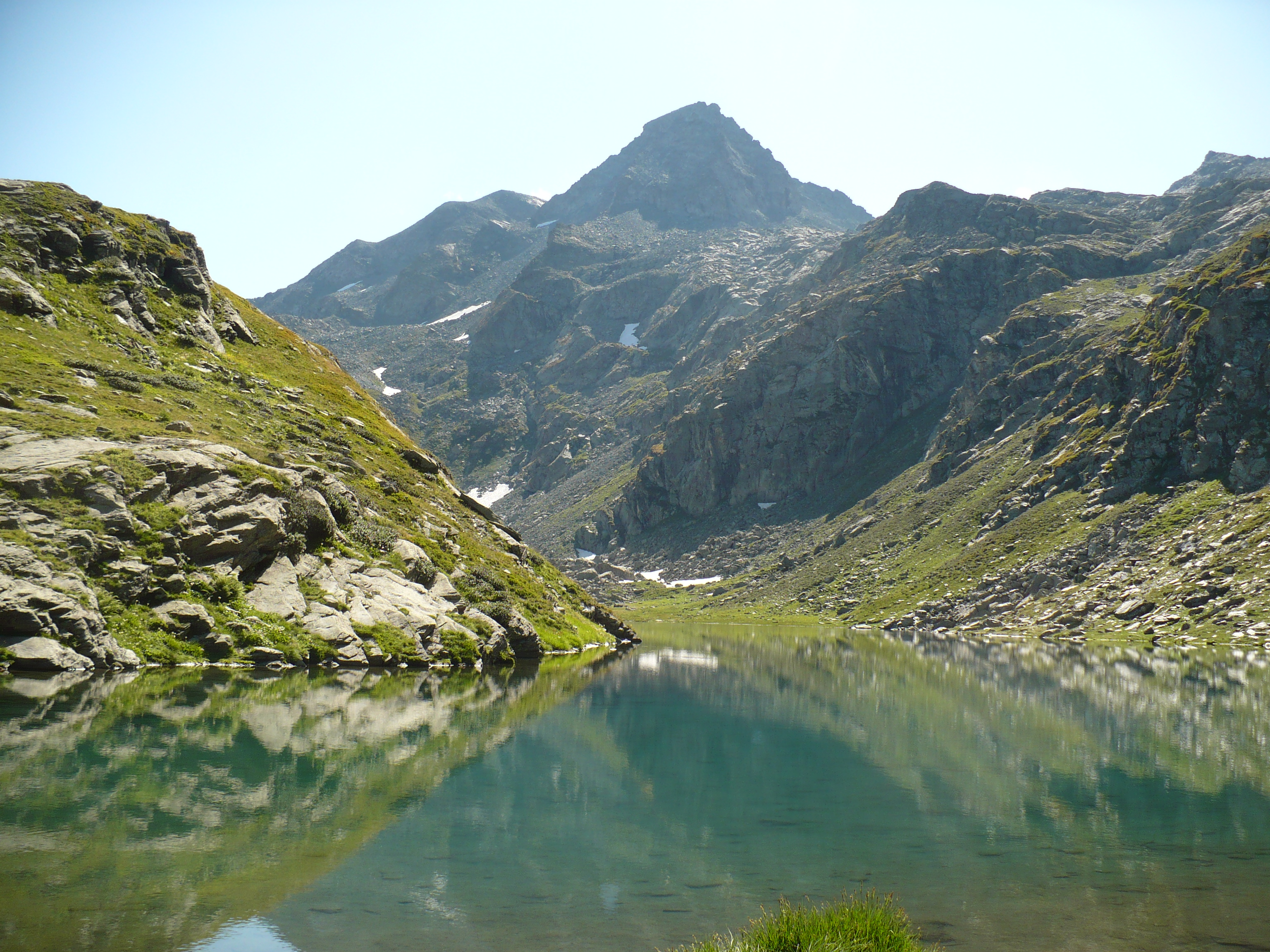

Highest point
- Elevation: 3,170 m (10,400 ft)
- Prominence: 250 m (820 ft)
- Isolation: 4.06 km (2.52 mi)
- Coordinates: 44°43′07″N 07°04′01″E

Geography
- Location within Alps
- Location: Piedmont, Italy
- Parent range: Cottian Alps

Climbing
- First ascent: 23 August 1879

Monte Granero is a peak in the Cottian Alps, in western Piedmont, northern Italy. It has an elevation of 3,170 m. It is located between the Val Pellice and the Valle Po, not far from the boundary with France.

Administratively it's divided between the Metropolitan City of Turin and the province of Cuneo, both in the Piedmont region.

The Pellice torrent starts from the Monte Granero's western slopes. The Monte Meidassa is located nearby.

== SOIUSA classification ==
According to the SOIUSA (International Standardized Mountain Subdivision of the Alps) the mountain can be classified in the following way:

- main part = Western Alps
- major sector = South Western Alps
- section = Cottian Alps
- subsection = southern Cottian Alps
- supergroup = catena Aiguillette-Monviso-Granero
- group = gruppo Granero-Frioland
- subgroup = gruppo del Monte Granero
- code = I/A-4.I-C.9.a

== Maps ==
- Italian official cartography (Istituto Geografico Militare - IGM); on-line version: www.pcn.minambiente.it
- French official cartography (Institut Géographique National - IGN); on-line version: www.geoportail.fr
