= Prali =

- Comune
- Comune di Prali
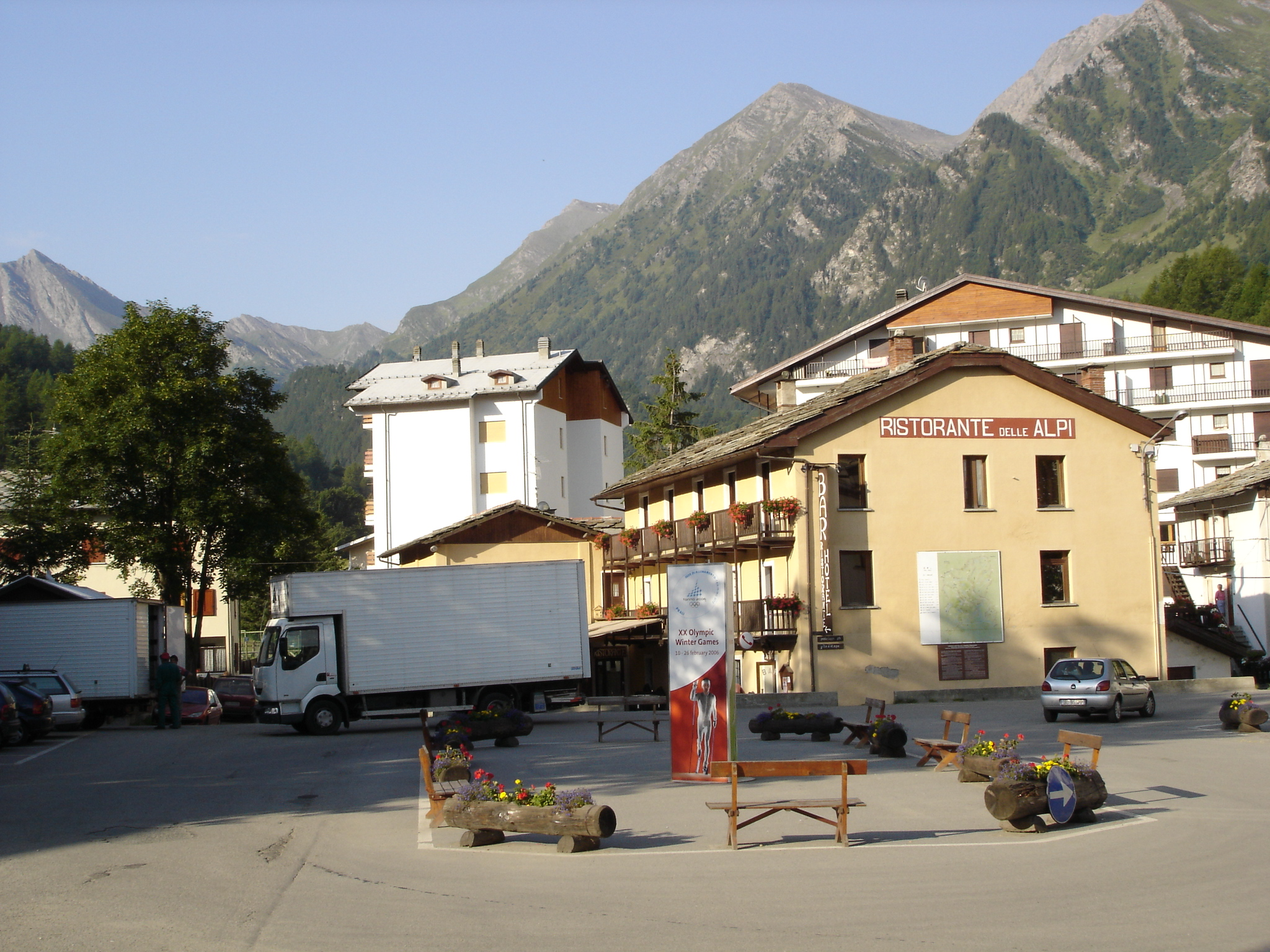

- Location within Italy Location within Piedmont
- Coordinates: 44°53′N 7°3′E
- Country: Italy
- Region: Piedmont
- Metropolitan city: Turin (TO)

Government
  - Mayor: Andrea Domard

Area
  - Total: 72.61 km^{2} (28.03 sq mi)
- Elevation: 1,455 m (4,774 ft)

Population (31 August 2021)
  - Total: 262
  - Density: 3.61/km^{2} (9.35/sq mi)
- Demonym: Pralini
- Time zone: UTC+1 (CET)
  - Summer (DST): UTC+2 (CEST)
- Postal code: 10060
- Dialing code: 0121
- Website: Official website

Prali is a comune (municipality) in the Metropolitan City of Turin in the Italian region Piedmont, located about 60 kilometres (37 mi) southwest of Turin, on the border with France. As of 31 December 2004, it had a population of 322 and an area of 72.6 square kilometres (28.0 mi^{2}).

Prali borders the following municipalities: Abriès (France), Angrogna, Bobbio Pellice, Perrero, Pragelato, Salza di Pinerolo, Sauze di Cesana, and Villar Pellice.

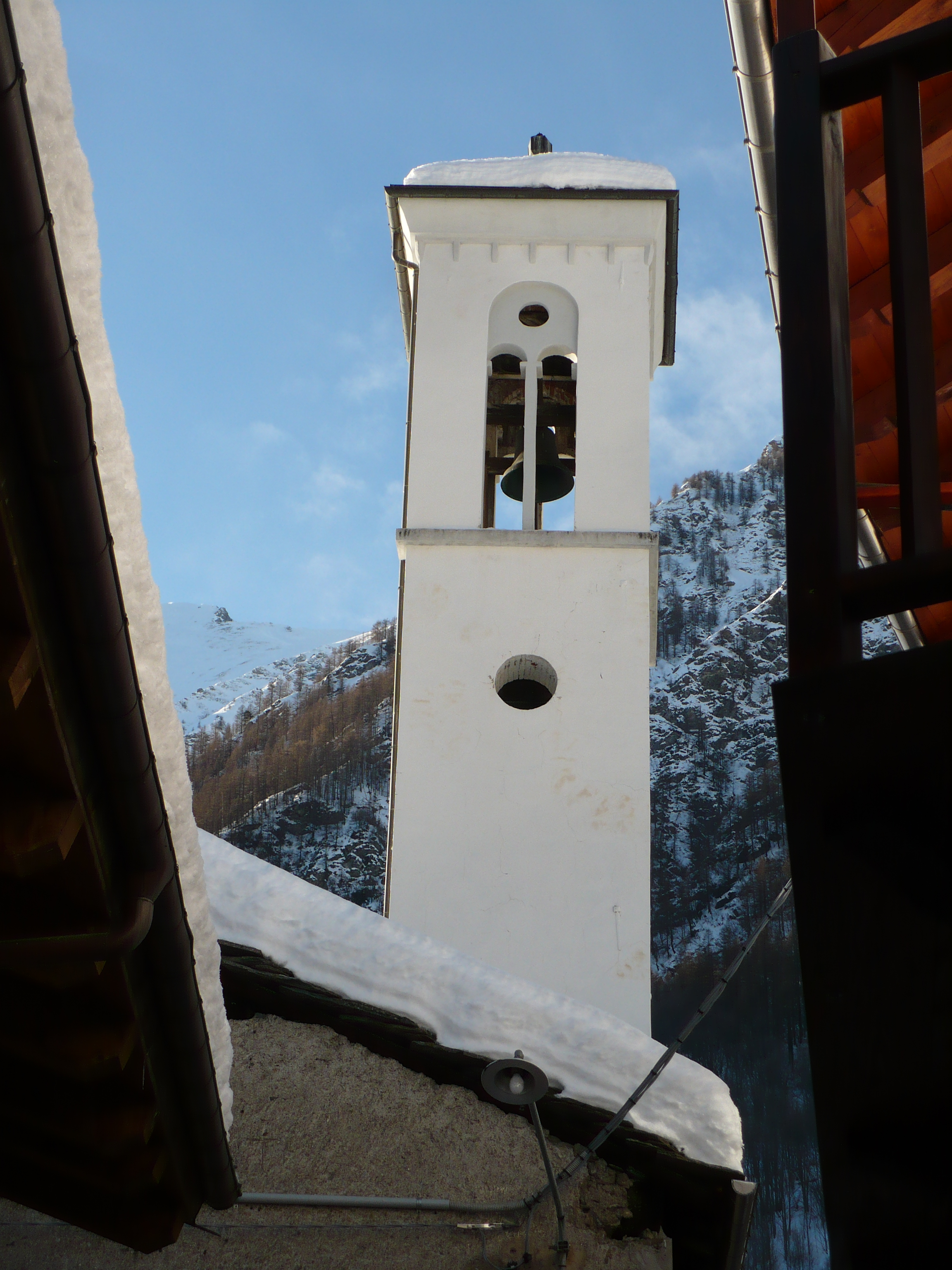
Campanile of the Waldensian temple in the frazione of Ghigo.

== Twin towns – sister cities ==
Prali is twinned with:

- Abriès, France
