= Balsamia hellenica =

Scientific classification
- Domain: Eukaryota
- Kingdom: Fungi
- Division: Ascomycota
- Class: Pezizomycetes
- Order: Pezizales
- Family: Helvellaceae
- Genus: Balsamia
- Species: B. hellenica

Binomial name
- Balsamia hellenica (Kaounas, Agnello, P.Alvarado & Slavova) K.Hansen & X.H.Wang

Species of fungus

Balsamia hellenica is a species of fungus from the genus Balsamia. It was previous placed in genus Barssia.
