= Pellice =

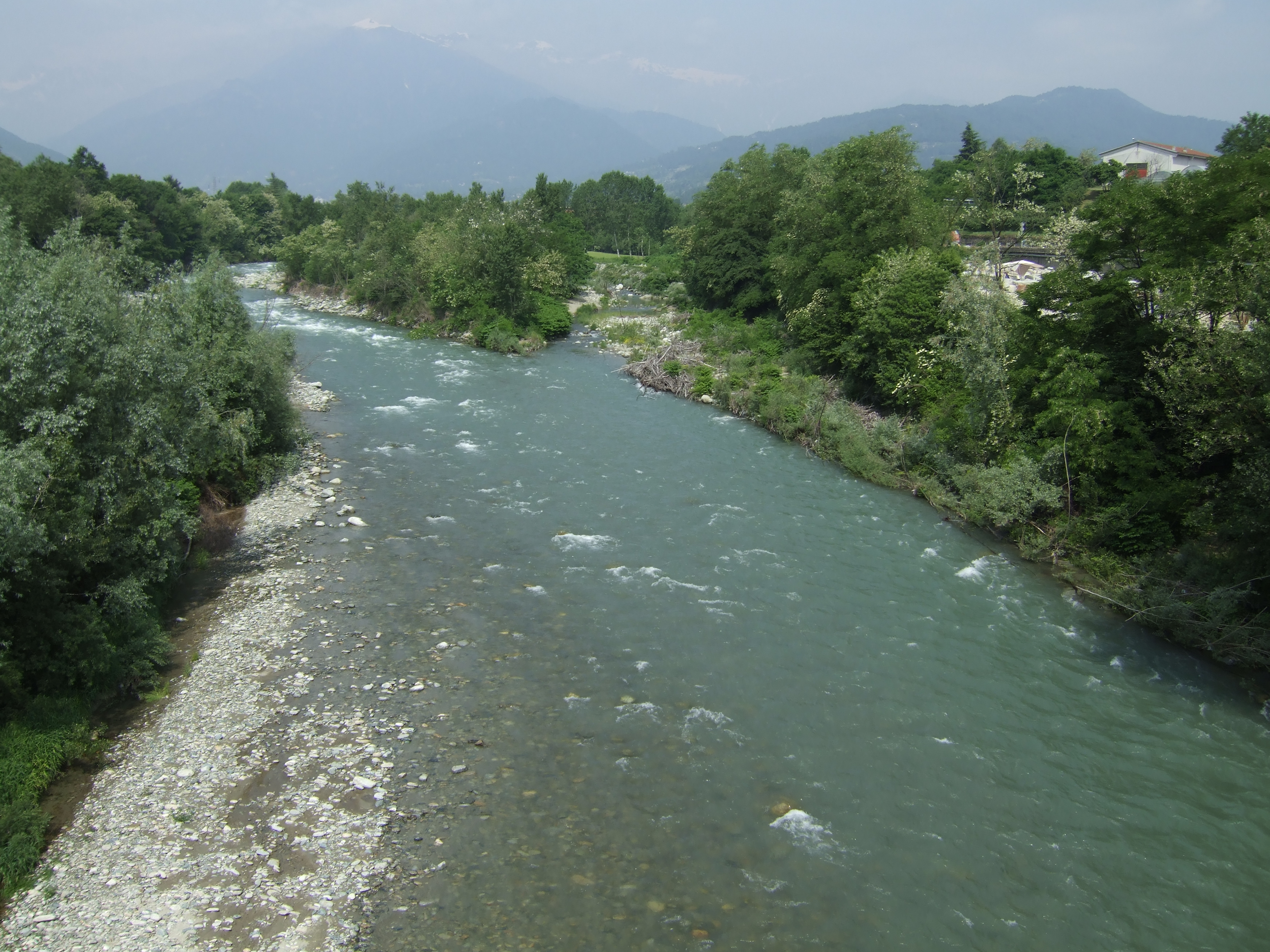
- The river at Bibiana.

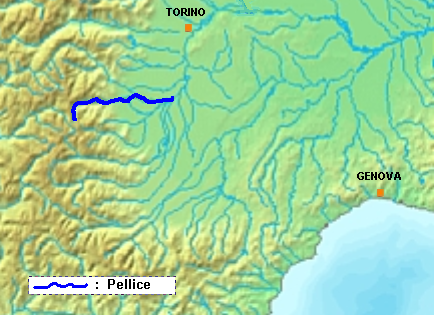
- Pellice location within northwestern Italy

Location
- Country: Italy

Physical characteristics
- Source
  - location: Monte Granero
- Mouth: Po
  - coordinates: 44.8105°N 7.5593°E
- Length: 53.0 kilometres (32.9 mi)
- Basin size: 974.03 square kilometres (376.08 sq mi)
- Discharge
  - average: (mouth) 21.32 m^{3}/s (753 cu ft/s)

Basin features
- Progression: Po→ Adriatic Sea

The Pellice (in Piedmontese Pélis) is a 53-kilometre (33 mi) Italian torrent, which runs through the Metropolitan City of Turin. The stream is a tributary of the Po River, into which it flows near Villafranca Piemonte.

== Geography ==
The stream is formed at the western slope of Monte Granero in the Cottian Alps and initially runs northwards, before turning east and reaching the comune of Bobbio Pellice. After receiving the waters of several torrents, such as the Ghiacciard, it forms the Val Pellice. Other streams flowing into the Pellice in its later course include the Angrogna and the Chiamogna, near the town of Bricherasio.

After the end of its mountain course, the torrent, 12 kilometres (7.5 mi) after Bricherasio, receives the waters of the Chisone between Cavour and Vigone, doubling its average discharge. It reaches the Po River at Villafranca.

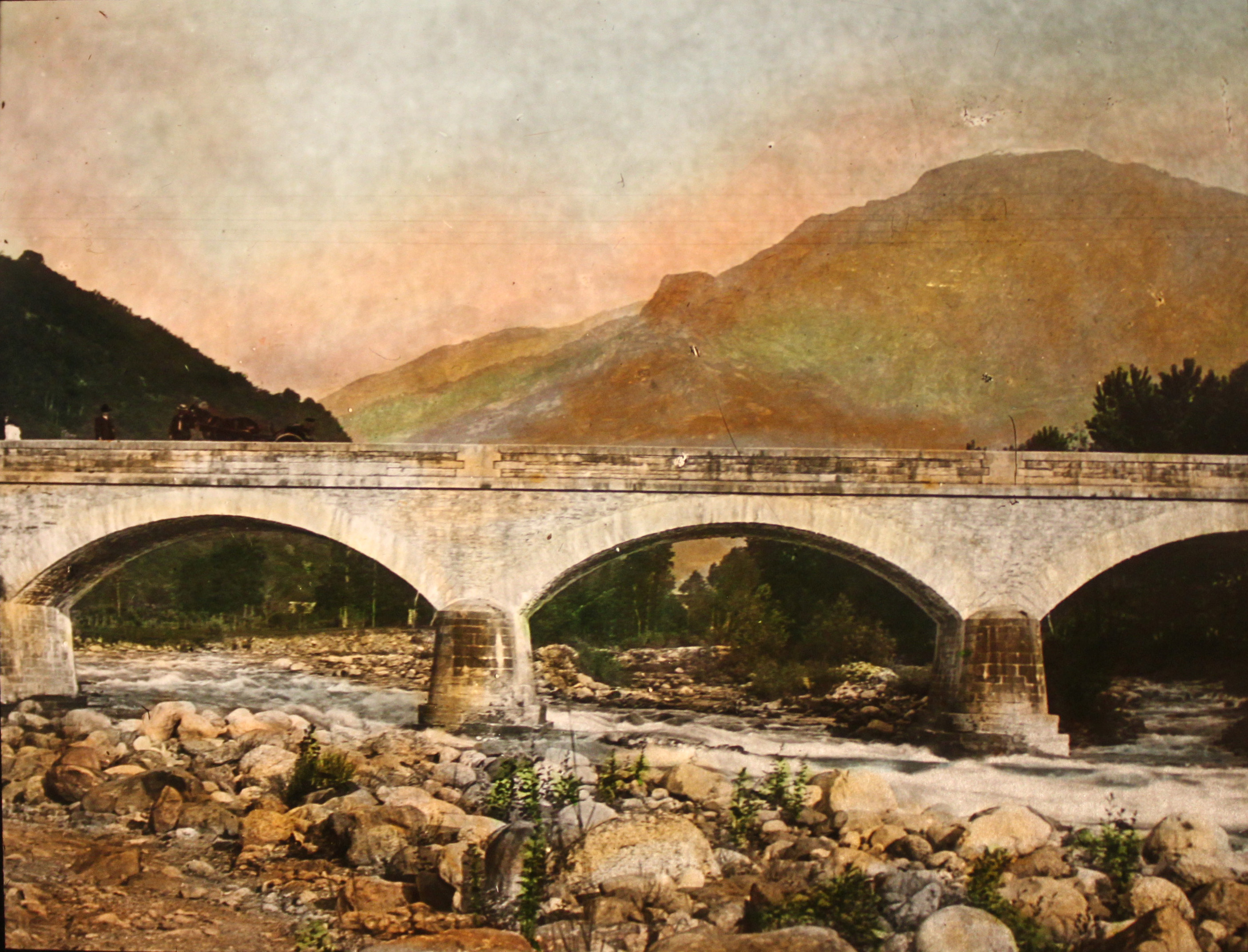
Bridge over the Pellice (Paillichee) 1895

== Sources ==
- Torino, I.G.C., Map n. 6 - Monviso
