= Balsamia maroccana =

Scientific classification
- Kingdom: Fungi
- Division: Ascomycota
- Class: Pezizomycetes
- Order: Pezizales
- Family: Helvellaceae
- Genus: Balsamia
- Species: B. maroccana

Binomial name
- Balsamia maroccana (G.Moreno, Manjón, Carlavilla & P.Alvarado) K.Hansen & X.H.Wang

Synonyms
- Barssia maroccana G. Moreno, Manjón, Carlavilla & P. Alvarado

Species of fungus

Balsamia maroccana is a species of fungus from the genus Balsamia.

== Location ==
Balsamia maroccana is primarily found in Morocco as its name suggests.
