= Pramollo =

- Comune
- Comune di Pramollo
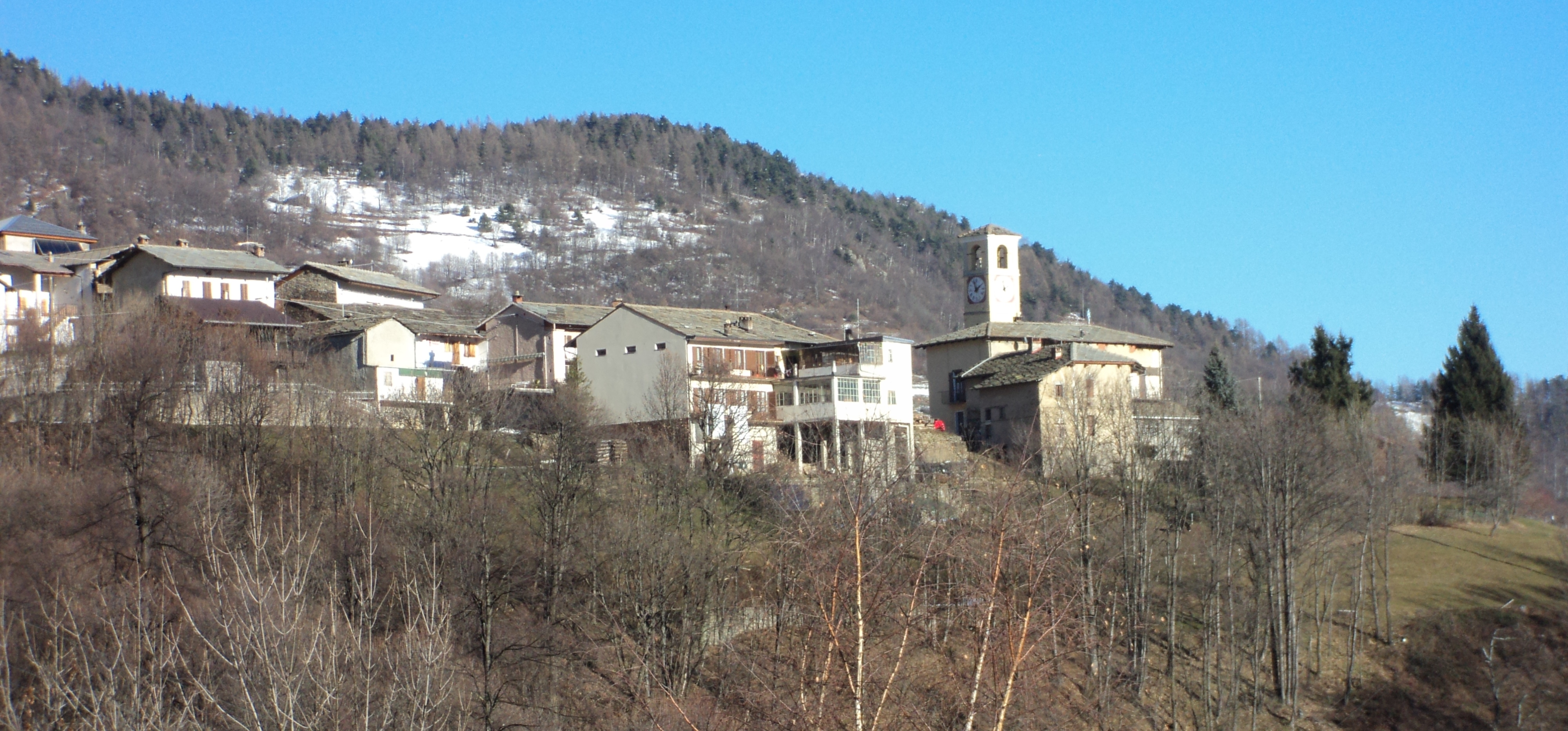
- View of La Ruata, one of the frazioni of Pramollo.

- Location within Italy Location within Piedmont
- Coordinates: 44°54′N 7°13′E
- Country: Italy
- Region: Piedmont
- Metropolitan city: Turin (TO)

Government
  - Mayor: Renzo Costantin

Area
  - Total: 22.48 km^{2} (8.68 sq mi)
- Elevation: 1,071 m (3,514 ft)

Population (31 August 2021)
  - Total: 221
  - Density: 9.83/km^{2} (25.5/sq mi)
- Demonym: Pramollini
- Time zone: UTC+1 (CET)
  - Summer (DST): UTC+2 (CEST)
- Postal code: 10065
- Dialing code: 0121
- Website: Official website

Pramollo (French: Pramol) is a comune (municipality) in the Metropolitan City of Turin in the Italian region Piedmont, located about 40 kilometres (25 mi) southwest of Turin.
