= List of municipalities of Piedmont =

Location of Piedmont in Italy

Provinces of Piedmont

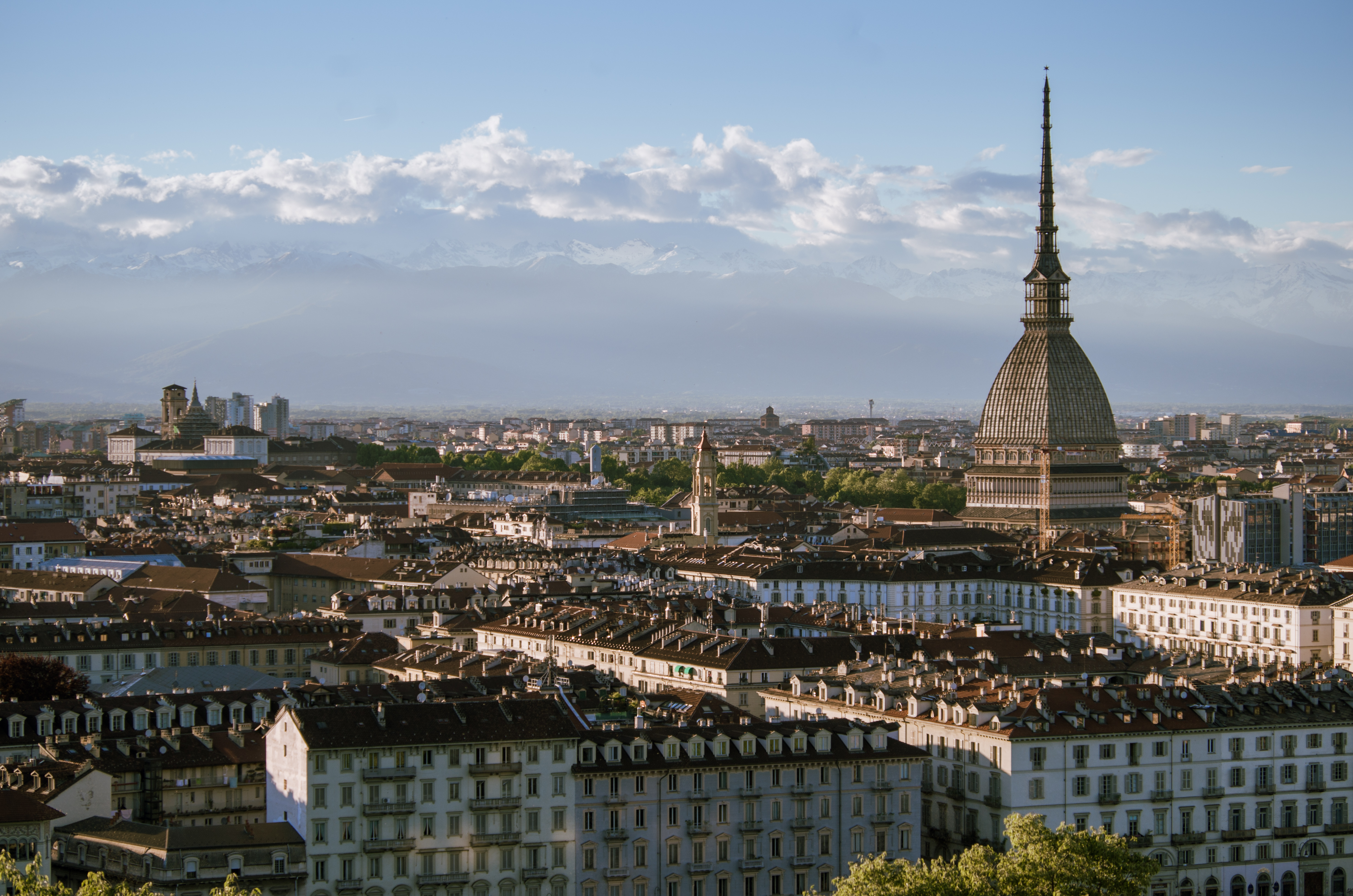
View of Turin, the capital of Piedmont

The following is a list of the municipalities (comuni) of the region of Piedmont in Italy.

There are 1,180 municipalities in Piedmont as of 2026:

- 187 in the Province of Alessandria
- 117 in the Province of Asti
- 74 in the Province of Biella
- 247 in the Province of Cuneo
- 87 in the Province of Novara
- 312 in the Metropolitan City of Turin
- 74 in the Province of Verbano-Cusio-Ossola
- 82 in the Province of Vercelli

== List ==
Municipality	Province	Population (2026)	Area (km²)	Density
Acceglio	Cuneo	171	151.53	1.1
Acqui Terme	Alessandria	19,017	33.30	571.1
Agliano Terme	Asti	1,545	15.45	100.0
Agliè	Turin	2,584	13.15	196.5
Agrate Conturbia	Novara	1,579	14.54	108.6
Ailoche	Biella	289	10.78	26.8
Airasca	Turin	3,698	15.74	234.9
Aisone	Cuneo	206	36.92	5.6
Ala di Stura	Turin	468	46.33	10.1
Alagna Valsesia	Vercelli	731	133.18	5.5
Alba	Cuneo	30,985	53.59	578.2
Albano Vercellese	Vercelli	327	13.78	23.7
Albaretto della Torre	Cuneo	205	4.59	44.7
Albera Ligure	Alessandria	292	21.23	13.8
Albiano d'Ivrea	Turin	1,633	11.73	139.2
Albugnano	Asti	525	9.54	55.0
Alessandria	Alessandria	93,409	203.57	458.9
Alfiano Natta	Alessandria	655	13.16	49.8
Alice Bel Colle	Alessandria	632	12.21	51.8
Alice Castello	Vercelli	2,479	24.57	100.9
Alluvioni Piovera	Alessandria	1,564	24.79	63.1
Almese	Turin	6,231	17.88	348.5
Alpette	Turin	235	5.63	41.7
Alpignano	Turin	16,513	11.92	1,385.3
Altavilla Monferrato	Alessandria	386	11.33	34.1
Alto	Cuneo	152	7.46	20.4
Alto Sermenza	Vercelli	133	60.32	2.2
Alzano Scrivia	Alessandria	354	2.13	166.2
Ameno	Novara	866	10.00	86.6
Andezeno	Turin	1,979	7.49	264.2
Andorno Micca	Biella	3,014	11.89	253.5
Andrate	Turin	468	9.31	50.3
Angrogna	Turin	794	38.88	20.4
Antignano	Asti	957	10.86	88.1
Antrona Schieranco	Verbano-Cusio-Ossola	392	100.18	3.9
Anzola d'Ossola	Verbano-Cusio-Ossola	378	13.66	27.7
Aramengo	Asti	574	11.41	50.3
Arborio	Vercelli	836	23.31	35.9
Argentera	Cuneo	76	76.26	1.0
Arguello	Cuneo	190	4.92	38.6
Arignano	Turin	1,076	8.17	131.7
Arizzano	Verbano-Cusio-Ossola	1,951	1.60	1,219.4
Armeno	Novara	2,089	31.52	66.3
Arola	Verbano-Cusio-Ossola	238	6.61	36.0
Arona	Novara	13,632	15.17	898.6
Arquata Scrivia	Alessandria	6,335	29.24	216.7
Asigliano Vercellese	Vercelli	1,387	26.32	52.7
Asti	Asti	73,604	151.31	486.4
Aurano	Verbano-Cusio-Ossola	111	21.16	5.2
Avigliana	Turin	12,035	23.22	518.3
Avolasca	Alessandria	241	12.24	19.7
Azeglio	Turin	1,224	9.96	122.9
Azzano d'Asti	Asti	383	6.43	59.6
Baceno	Verbano-Cusio-Ossola	862	77.27	11.2
Bagnasco	Cuneo	929	30.95	30.0
Bagnolo Piemonte	Cuneo	5,685	63.25	89.9
Bairo	Turin	778	7.09	109.7
Balangero	Turin	3,095	13.01	237.9
Baldichieri d'Asti	Asti	1,104	5.07	217.8
Baldissero Canavese	Turin	493	4.51	109.3
Baldissero d'Alba	Cuneo	1,043	15.33	68.0
Baldissero Torinese	Turin	3,692	15.41	239.6
Balme	Turin	97	62.71	1.5
Balmuccia	Vercelli	115	9.79	11.7
Balocco	Vercelli	210	16.81	12.5
Balzola	Alessandria	1,252	16.62	75.3
Banchette	Turin	3,097	2.03	1,525.6
Bannio Anzino	Verbano-Cusio-Ossola	453	39.47	11.5
Barbania	Turin	1,563	12.80	122.1
Barbaresco	Cuneo	600	7.76	77.3
Bardonecchia	Turin	2,853	132.20	21.6
Barengo	Novara	734	19.49	37.7
Barge	Cuneo	7,510	81.99	91.6
Barolo	Cuneo	613	5.69	107.7
Barone Canavese	Turin	525	3.99	131.6
Basaluzzo	Alessandria	2,009	15.05	133.5
Bassignana	Alessandria	1,574	28.71	54.8
Bastia Mondovì	Cuneo	628	12.00	52.3
Battifollo	Cuneo	256	11.12	23.0
Baveno	Verbano-Cusio-Ossola	4,504	17.10	263.4
Bee	Verbano-Cusio-Ossola	777	3.50	222.0
Beinasco	Turin	17,272	6.73	2,566.4
Beinette	Cuneo	3,540	17.69	200.1
Belforte Monferrato	Alessandria	486	8.33	58.3
Belgirate	Verbano-Cusio-Ossola	450	7.13	63.1
Bellino	Cuneo	99	62.07	1.6
Bellinzago Novarese	Novara	9,344	39.18	238.5
Belvedere Langhe	Cuneo	333	5.00	66.6
Belveglio	Asti	292	5.28	55.3
Bene Vagienna	Cuneo	3,645	48.97	74.4
Benevello	Cuneo	457	5.44	84.0
Benna	Biella	1,157	9.39	123.2
Bergamasco	Alessandria	662	13.44	49.3
Bergolo	Cuneo	51	3.11	16.4
Bernezzo	Cuneo	4,276	25.84	165.5
Berzano di San Pietro	Asti	404	7.34	55.0
Berzano di Tortona	Alessandria	163	2.89	56.4
Beura-Cardezza	Verbano-Cusio-Ossola	1,429	28.55	50.1
Biandrate	Novara	1,384	12.45	111.2
Bianzè	Vercelli	1,869	41.81	44.7
Bibiana	Turin	3,362	18.60	180.8
Biella	Biella	43,356	46.69	928.6
Bioglio	Biella	888	18.85	47.1
Bistagno	Alessandria	1,692	17.59	96.2
Bobbio Pellice	Turin	527	94.08	5.6
Boca	Novara	1,145	9.61	119.1
Boccioleto	Vercelli	167	33.87	4.9
Bognanco	Verbano-Cusio-Ossola	198	58.00	3.4
Bogogno	Novara	1,324	8.51	155.6
Bollengo	Turin	2,099	14.22	147.6
Bolzano Novarese	Novara	1,110	3.30	336.4
Bonvicino	Cuneo	102	7.24	14.1
Borgaro Torinese	Turin	11,523	11.10	1,038.1
Borghetto di Borbera	Alessandria	1,889	39.40	47.9
Borgiallo	Turin	587	6.96	84.3
Borgo d'Ale	Vercelli	2,198	39.57	55.5
Borgo San Dalmazzo	Cuneo	12,618	22.34	564.8
Borgo San Martino	Alessandria	1,333	9.72	137.1
Borgo Ticino	Novara	5,145	13.37	384.8
Borgo Vercelli	Vercelli	2,231	19.30	115.6
Borgofranco d'Ivrea	Turin	3,424	13.42	255.1
Borgolavezzaro	Novara	2,025	21.09	96.0
Borgomale	Cuneo	372	8.48	43.9
Borgomanero	Novara	21,202	32.27	657.0
Borgomasino	Turin	770	12.37	62.2
Borgomezzavalle	Verbano-Cusio-Ossola	284	19.09	14.9
Borgone Susa	Turin	2,250	4.96	453.6
Borgoratto Alessandrino	Alessandria	534	6.60	80.9
Borgosesia	Vercelli	11,951	41.09	290.8
Borriana	Biella	855	5.35	159.8
Bosco Marengo	Alessandria	2,140	44.53	48.1
Bosconero	Turin	3,044	10.92	278.8
Bosia	Cuneo	168	5.54	30.3
Bosio	Alessandria	1,037	67.61	15.3
Bossolasco	Cuneo	664	14.55	45.6
Boves	Cuneo	9,612	50.95	188.7
Bozzole	Alessandria	343	9.02	38.0
Bra	Cuneo	29,830	59.53	501.1
Brandizzo	Turin	8,772	6.29	1,394.6
Briaglia	Cuneo	311	6.24	49.8
Bricherasio	Turin	4,611	22.76	202.6
Briga Alta	Cuneo	41	52.18	0.8
Briga Novarese	Novara	2,730	4.75	574.7
Brignano-Frascata	Alessandria	420	17.53	24.0
Briona	Novara	1,129	24.76	45.6
Brondello	Cuneo	260	10.12	25.7
Brossasco	Cuneo	979	28.06	34.9
Brosso	Turin	387	11.14	34.7
Brovello-Carpugnino	Verbano-Cusio-Ossola	804	8.22	97.8
Brozolo	Turin	423	8.95	47.3
Bruino	Turin	8,364	5.57	1,501.6
Bruno	Asti	305	8.90	34.3
Brusasco	Turin	1,495	14.36	104.1
Brusnengo	Biella	1,845	10.45	176.6
Bruzolo	Turin	1,513	12.56	120.5
Bubbio	Asti	793	15.76	50.3
Buriasco	Turin	1,289	14.69	87.7
Burolo	Turin	1,095	5.48	199.8
Buronzo	Vercelli	862	25.08	34.4
Busano	Turin	1,578	5.06	311.9
Busca	Cuneo	10,228	76.77	133.2
Bussoleno	Turin	5,766	37.07	155.5
Buttigliera Alta	Turin	6,222	8.10	768.1
Buttigliera d'Asti	Asti	2,505	19.16	130.7
Cabella Ligure	Alessandria	437	46.63	9.4
Cafasse	Turin	3,388	10.23	331.2
Calamandrana	Asti	1,643	12.79	128.5
Calasca-Castiglione	Verbano-Cusio-Ossola	581	57.07	10.2
Callabiana	Biella	145	6.56	22.1
Calliano	Asti	1,235	17.29	71.4
Calosso	Asti	1,102	15.72	70.1
Caltignaga	Novara	2,453	22.32	109.9
Caluso	Turin	7,338	39.49	185.8
Camagna Monferrato	Alessandria	464	9.25	50.2
Camandona	Biella	321	9.20	34.9
Cambiano	Turin	5,884	14.13	416.4
Cambiasca	Verbano-Cusio-Ossola	1,630	3.96	411.6
Camburzano	Biella	1,127	3.80	296.6
Camerana	Cuneo	551	23.64	23.3
Camerano Casasco	Asti	421	6.89	61.1
Cameri	Novara	10,867	39.99	271.7
Camino	Alessandria	730	18.44	39.6
Campertogno	Vercelli	226	34.14	6.6
Campiglia Cervo	Biella	488	28.20	17.3
Campiglione-Fenile	Turin	1,297	11.09	117.0
Canale	Cuneo	5,404	17.87	302.4
Candelo	Biella	7,196	15.12	475.9
Candia Canavese	Turin	1,143	9.13	125.2
Candiolo	Turin	5,563	11.85	469.5
Canelli	Asti	10,014	23.43	427.4
Canischio	Turin	269	11.95	22.5
Cannero Riviera	Verbano-Cusio-Ossola	885	14.42	61.4
Cannobio	Verbano-Cusio-Ossola	5,012	52.53	95.4
Canosio	Cuneo	76	48.45	1.6
Cantalupa	Turin	2,581	11.20	230.4
Cantalupo Ligure	Alessandria	431	24.06	17.9
Cantarana	Asti	974	9.72	100.2
Cantoira	Turin	645	23.03	28.0
Caprauna	Cuneo	78	11.50	6.8
Caprezzo	Verbano-Cusio-Ossola	175	7.26	24.1
Capriata d'Orba	Alessandria	1,776	28.47	62.4
Caprie	Turin	2,014	16.41	122.7
Capriglio	Asti	295	5.06	58.3
Caprile	Biella	191	11.60	16.5
Caraglio	Cuneo	6,842	41.68	164.2
Caramagna Piemonte	Cuneo	3,013	26.33	114.4
Caravino	Turin	891	11.54	77.2
Carbonara Scrivia	Alessandria	1,114	5.05	220.6
Carcoforo	Vercelli	78	22.80	3.4
Cardè	Cuneo	1,174	19.31	60.8
Carema	Turin	697	10.26	67.9
Carentino	Alessandria	311	9.79	31.8
Caresana	Vercelli	995	24.11	41.3
Caresanablot	Vercelli	1,110	11.02	100.7
Carezzano	Alessandria	437	10.48	41.7
Carignano	Turin	9,250	50.68	182.5
Carisio	Vercelli	744	30.11	24.7
Carmagnola	Turin	27,971	95.72	292.2
Carpeneto	Alessandria	848	13.34	63.6
Carpignano Sesia	Novara	2,457	14.66	167.6
Carrega Ligure	Alessandria	76	55.26	1.4
Carrosio	Alessandria	519	6.92	75.0
Carrù	Cuneo	4,494	25.84	173.9
Cartignano	Cuneo	161	6.42	25.1
Cartosio	Alessandria	711	16.34	43.5
Casal Cermelli	Alessandria	1,189	12.16	97.8
Casalbeltrame	Novara	1,047	16.04	65.3
Casalborgone	Turin	1,865	20.13	92.6
Casale Corte Cerro	Verbano-Cusio-Ossola	3,278	12.52	261.8
Casale Monferrato	Alessandria	32,461	86.21	376.5
Casaleggio Boiro	Alessandria	335	12.01	27.9
Casaleggio Novara	Novara	917	10.53	87.1
Casalgrasso	Cuneo	1,458	17.81	81.9
Casalino	Novara	1,586	39.49	40.2
Casalnoceto	Alessandria	945	12.98	72.8
Casalvolone	Novara	888	17.49	50.8
Casanova Elvo	Vercelli	220	16.21	13.6
Casapinta	Biella	365	2.86	127.6
Casasco	Alessandria	134	9.04	14.8
Cascinette d'Ivrea	Turin	1,503	2.17	692.6
Caselette	Turin	3,024	14.31	211.3
Caselle Torinese	Turin	13,738	23.55	583.4
Casorzo	Asti	581	12.65	45.9
Cassano Spinola	Alessandria	1,796	17.13	104.8
Cassinasco	Asti	559	11.84	47.2
Cassine	Alessandria	2,811	33.09	85.0
Cassinelle	Alessandria	845	23.77	35.5
Castagneto Po	Turin	1,748	11.47	152.4
Castagnito	Cuneo	2,294	7.11	322.6
Castagnole delle Lanze	Asti	3,660	21.57	169.7
Castagnole Monferrato	Asti	1,129	17.34	65.1
Castagnole Piemonte	Turin	2,168	17.28	125.5
Castel Boglione	Asti	591	11.86	49.8
Castel Rocchero	Asti	356	5.63	63.2
Casteldelfino	Cuneo	143	33.95	4.2
Castell'Alfero	Asti	2,588	20.09	128.8
Castellamonte	Turin	9,839	38.71	254.2
Castellania Coppi	Alessandria	85	7.21	11.8
Castellar Guidobono	Alessandria	429	2.48	173.0
Castellazzo Bormida	Alessandria	4,519	45.13	100.1
Castellazzo Novarese	Novara	331	10.79	30.7
Castellero	Asti	281	4.29	65.5
Castelletto Cervo	Biella	758	14.90	50.9
Castelletto d'Erro	Alessandria	115	4.66	24.7
Castelletto d'Orba	Alessandria	1,811	13.98	129.5
Castelletto Merli	Alessandria	445	11.59	38.4
Castelletto Molina	Asti	137	3.07	44.6
Castelletto Monferrato	Alessandria	1,439	9.58	150.2
Castelletto Sopra Ticino	Novara	9,834	14.64	671.7
Castelletto Stura	Cuneo	1,377	17.13	80.4
Castelletto Uzzone	Cuneo	277	14.86	18.6
Castellinaldo	Cuneo	911	7.80	116.8
Castellino Tanaro	Cuneo	273	11.52	23.7
Castello di Annone	Asti	1,827	23.18	78.8
Castelmagno	Cuneo	51	49.31	1.0
Castelnuovo Belbo	Asti	815	9.55	85.3
Castelnuovo Bormida	Alessandria	636	13.11	48.5
Castelnuovo Calcea	Asti	680	8.20	82.9
Castelnuovo di Ceva	Cuneo	102	6.26	16.3
Castelnuovo Don Bosco	Asti	3,095	21.61	143.2
Castelnuovo Nigra	Turin	417	28.38	14.7
Castelnuovo Scrivia	Alessandria	4,807	45.42	105.8
Castelspina	Alessandria	391	5.49	71.2
Castiglione Falletto	Cuneo	655	4.72	138.8
Castiglione Tinella	Cuneo	746	11.63	64.1
Castiglione Torinese	Turin	6,519	14.13	461.4
Castino	Cuneo	431	15.52	27.8
Cavaglià	Biella	3,464	25.63	135.2
Cavaglietto	Novara	387	6.49	59.6
Cavaglio d'Agogna	Novara	1,143	9.83	116.3
Cavagnolo	Turin	2,357	12.33	191.2
Cavallerleone	Cuneo	664	16.44	40.4
Cavallermaggiore	Cuneo	5,329	51.60	103.3
Cavallirio	Novara	1,290	8.33	154.9
Cavatore	Alessandria	248	10.45	23.7
Cavour	Turin	5,373	48.96	109.7
Cella Monte	Alessandria	446	5.55	80.4
Cellarengo	Asti	731	10.85	67.4
Celle di Macra	Cuneo	83	31.11	2.7
Celle Enomondo	Asti	430	5.59	76.9
Cellio con Breia	Vercelli	957	17.28	55.4
Centallo	Cuneo	6,985	42.49	164.4
Ceppo Morelli	Verbano-Cusio-Ossola	285	40.19	7.1
Cerano	Novara	6,995	32.64	214.3
Cercenasco	Turin	1,760	13.16	133.7
Ceres	Turin	957	28.05	34.1
Cereseto	Alessandria	355	10.44	34.0
Ceresole Alba	Cuneo	1,975	37.05	53.3
Ceresole Reale	Turin	139	99.82	1.4
Cerreto d'Asti	Asti	217	4.82	45.0
Cerreto Grue	Alessandria	293	4.75	61.7
Cerretto Langhe	Cuneo	387	10.14	38.2
Cerrina Monferrato	Alessandria	1,264	17.30	73.1
Cerrione	Biella	2,750	27.99	98.2
Cerro Tanaro	Asti	594	4.65	127.7
Cervasca	Cuneo	5,190	18.24	284.5
Cervatto	Vercelli	47	9.54	4.9
Cervere	Cuneo	2,280	18.60	122.6
Cesana Torinese	Turin	887	121.70	7.3
Cesara	Verbano-Cusio-Ossola	666	11.65	57.2
Cessole	Asti	327	11.78	27.8
Ceva	Cuneo	5,895	43.17	136.6
Cherasco	Cuneo	9,713	81.54	119.1
Chialamberto	Turin	336	35.45	9.5
Chianocco	Turin	1,494	18.61	80.3
Chiaverano	Turin	1,958	12.02	162.9
Chieri	Turin	35,822	54.20	660.9
Chiesanuova	Turin	229	4.12	55.6
Chiomonte	Turin	838	26.76	31.3
Chiusa di Pesio	Cuneo	3,716	95.02	39.1
Chiusa di San Michele	Turin	1,524	5.92	257.4
Chiusano d'Asti	Asti	242	2.42	100.0
Chivasso	Turin	26,038	51.24	508.2
Ciconio	Turin	358	3.16	113.3
Cigliano	Vercelli	4,300	25.31	169.9
Cigliè	Cuneo	196	6.12	32.0
Cinaglio	Asti	404	5.50	73.5
Cintano	Turin	225	4.93	45.6
Cinzano	Turin	340	6.20	54.8
Cirié	Turin	18,083	17.73	1,019.9
Cissone	Cuneo	76	5.90	12.9
Cisterna d'Asti	Asti	1,221	10.73	113.8
Civiasco	Vercelli	223	7.39	30.2
Clavesana	Cuneo	775	17.15	45.2
Claviere	Turin	199	2.69	74.0
Coassolo Torinese	Turin	1,460	27.88	52.4
Coazze	Turin	3,371	56.57	59.6
Coazzolo	Asti	285	4.05	70.4
Cocconato	Asti	1,415	16.52	85.7
Coggiola	Biella	1,617	23.78	68.0
Colazza	Novara	553	3.16	175.0
Collegno	Turin	47,590	18.10	2,629.3
Colleretto Castelnuovo	Turin	354	6.33	55.9
Colleretto Giacosa	Turin	576	4.59	125.5
Collobiano	Vercelli	68	9.22	7.4
Comignago	Novara	1,264	4.45	284.0
Condove	Turin	4,422	71.11	62.2
Coniolo	Alessandria	420	10.30	40.8
Conzano	Alessandria	892	11.61	76.8
Corio	Turin	3,106	41.49	74.9
Corneliano d'Alba	Cuneo	2,167	10.09	214.8
Corsione	Asti	191	5.08	37.6
Cortandone	Asti	307	5.02	61.2
Cortanze	Asti	262	4.48	58.5
Cortazzone	Asti	596	10.33	57.7
Cortemilia	Cuneo	2,104	24.99	84.2
Cortiglione	Asti	507	8.43	60.1
Cossano Belbo	Cuneo	858	20.54	41.8
Cossano Canavese	Turin	410	3.24	126.5
Cossato	Biella	13,833	27.73	498.8
Cossogno	Verbano-Cusio-Ossola	662	40.26	16.4
Cossombrato	Asti	506	5.40	93.7
Costa Vescovato	Alessandria	310	7.90	39.2
Costanzana	Vercelli	815	20.97	38.9
Costigliole d'Asti	Asti	5,664	36.94	153.3
Costigliole Saluzzo	Cuneo	3,307	15.34	215.6
Cravagliana	Vercelli	240	34.86	6.9
Cravanzana	Cuneo	344	8.12	42.4
Craveggia	Verbano-Cusio-Ossola	789	36.22	21.8
Cremolino	Alessandria	1,002	14.39	69.6
Crescentino	Vercelli	7,503	48.22	155.6
Cressa	Novara	1,559	7.10	219.6
Crevacuore	Biella	1,373	8.60	159.7
Crevoladossola	Verbano-Cusio-Ossola	4,385	39.87	110.0
Crissolo	Cuneo	132	52.05	2.5
Crodo	Verbano-Cusio-Ossola	1,413	53.58	26.4
Crova	Vercelli	347	14.02	24.8
Cuceglio	Turin	917	6.87	133.5
Cumiana	Turin	7,814	60.73	128.7
Cuneo	Cuneo	55,747	119.67	465.8
Cunico	Asti	427	6.75	63.3
Cuorgnè	Turin	9,483	19.31	491.1
Cureggio	Novara	2,619	8.51	307.8
Curino	Biella	466	21.65	21.5
Demonte	Cuneo	1,848	127.31	14.5
Denice	Alessandria	161	7.46	21.6
Dernice	Alessandria	174	18.28	9.5
Desana	Vercelli	1,097	16.48	66.6
Diano d'Alba	Cuneo	3,547	17.54	202.2
Divignano	Novara	1,428	5.10	280.0
Dogliani	Cuneo	4,605	35.68	129.1
Domodossola	Verbano-Cusio-Ossola	17,625	36.89	477.8
Donato	Biella	681	12.07	56.4
Dormelletto	Novara	2,556	7.25	352.6
Dorzano	Biella	528	4.74	111.4
Dronero	Cuneo	7,007	58.96	118.8
Druento	Turin	8,942	27.54	324.7
Druogno	Verbano-Cusio-Ossola	1,029	29.61	34.8
Dusino San Michele	Asti	1,081	11.93	90.6
Elva	Cuneo	80	26.22	3.1
Entracque	Cuneo	741	160.73	4.6
Envie	Cuneo	1,952	24.93	78.3
Exilles	Turin	241	46.55	5.2
Fabbrica Curone	Alessandria	530	53.84	9.8
Fara Novarese	Novara	2,009	9.21	218.1
Farigliano	Cuneo	1,698	16.44	103.3
Faule	Cuneo	474	7.03	67.4
Favria	Turin	4,962	14.85	334.1
Feisoglio	Cuneo	288	7.67	37.5
Feletto	Turin	2,151	7.89	272.6
Felizzano	Alessandria	2,066	25.01	82.6
Fenestrelle	Turin	466	49.41	9.4
Ferrere	Asti	1,511	13.93	108.5
Fiano	Turin	2,638	12.04	219.1
Fiorano Canavese	Turin	725	4.35	166.7
Fobello	Vercelli	185	28.14	6.6
Foglizzo	Turin	2,278	15.64	145.7
Fontaneto d'Agogna	Novara	2,656	21.17	125.5
Fontanetto Po	Vercelli	1,036	23.24	44.6
Fontanile	Asti	473	8.13	58.2
Formazza	Verbano-Cusio-Ossola	410	130.65	3.1
Formigliana	Vercelli	488	16.76	29.1
Forno Canavese	Turin	3,152	16.50	191.0
Fossano	Cuneo	24,157	130.15	185.6
Frabosa Soprana	Cuneo	740	47.14	15.7
Frabosa Sottana	Cuneo	1,644	37.64	43.7
Fraconalto	Alessandria	307	17.62	17.4
Francavilla Bisio	Alessandria	491	7.75	63.4
Frascaro	Alessandria	425	5.29	80.3
Frassinello Monferrato	Alessandria	449	8.43	53.3
Frassineto Po	Alessandria	1,349	29.57	45.6
Frassinetto	Turin	272	24.82	11.0
Frassino	Cuneo	250	17.01	14.7
Fresonara	Alessandria	651	6.93	93.9
Frinco	Asti	722	7.22	100.0
Front	Turin	1,590	10.95	145.2
Frossasco	Turin	2,846	20.15	141.2
Frugarolo	Alessandria	1,882	27.06	69.5
Fubine	Alessandria	1,604	25.53	62.8
Gabiano	Alessandria	1,033	17.77	58.1
Gaglianico	Biella	3,803	4.50	845.1
Gaiola	Cuneo	574	4.97	115.5
Galliate	Novara	15,884	29.37	540.8
Gamalero	Alessandria	783	12.15	64.4
Gambasca	Cuneo	376	5.74	65.5
Garbagna	Alessandria	638	20.72	30.8
Garbagna Novarese	Novara	1,397	10.05	139.0
Garessio	Cuneo	2,833	131.29	21.6
Gargallo	Novara	1,751	3.75	466.9
Garzigliana	Turin	564	7.40	76.2
Gassino Torinese	Turin	9,208	20.51	449.0
Gattico-Veruno	Novara	5,311	26.16	203.0
Gattinara	Vercelli	7,548	33.67	224.2
Gavi	Alessandria	4,344	45.04	96.4
Genola	Cuneo	2,564	13.72	186.9
Germagnano	Turin	1,131	14.44	78.3
Germagno	Verbano-Cusio-Ossola	185	2.90	63.8
Ghemme	Novara	3,429	20.64	166.1
Ghiffa	Verbano-Cusio-Ossola	2,165	14.65	147.8
Ghislarengo	Vercelli	820	12.50	65.6
Giaglione	Turin	585	33.38	17.5
Giarole	Alessandria	682	5.45	125.1
Giaveno	Turin	16,361	71.74	228.1
Gifflenga	Biella	104	2.26	46.0
Gignese	Verbano-Cusio-Ossola	1,119	14.58	76.7
Givoletto	Turin	4,060	12.82	316.7
Gorzegno	Cuneo	239	13.97	17.1
Gottasecca	Cuneo	116	13.68	8.5
Govone	Cuneo	2,233	18.91	118.1
Gozzano	Novara	5,464	12.58	434.3
Graglia	Biella	1,440	20.14	71.5
Grana	Asti	507	5.89	86.1
Granozzo con Monticello	Novara	1,302	19.52	66.7
Gravellona Toce	Verbano-Cusio-Ossola	7,642	14.21	537.8
Gravere	Turin	684	18.99	36.0
Grazzano Badoglio	Asti	511	10.47	48.8
Greggio	Vercelli	330	11.88	27.8
Gremiasco	Alessandria	277	17.38	15.9
Grignasco	Novara	4,299	14.33	300.0
Grinzane Cavour	Cuneo	1,938	3.81	508.7
Grognardo	Alessandria	225	9.08	24.8
Grondona	Alessandria	477	25.94	18.4
Groscavallo	Turin	183	92.09	2.0
Grosso	Turin	1,004	4.33	231.9
Grugliasco	Turin	36,410	13.13	2,773.0
Guardabosone	Vercelli	296	6.09	48.6
Guarene	Cuneo	3,548	13.45	263.8
Guazzora	Alessandria	288	2.80	102.9
Gurro	Verbano-Cusio-Ossola	159	13.29	12.0
Igliano	Cuneo	63	3.40	18.5
Incisa Scapaccino	Asti	2,006	20.70	96.9
Ingria	Turin	44	14.75	3.0
Intragna	Verbano-Cusio-Ossola	85	9.92	8.6
Inverso Pinasca	Turin	677	8.03	84.3
Invorio	Novara	4,290	17.37	247.0
Isasca	Cuneo	63	5.08	12.4
Isola d'Asti	Asti	1,897	13.50	140.5
Isola Sant'Antonio	Alessandria	654	23.55	27.8
Isolabella	Turin	355	4.77	74.4
Issiglio	Turin	434	5.50	78.9
Ivrea	Turin	22,544	30.11	748.7
La Cassa	Turin	1,719	12.04	142.8
La Loggia	Turin	8,673	12.79	678.1
La Morra	Cuneo	2,626	24.17	108.6
Lagnasco	Cuneo	1,384	17.71	78.1
Lamporo	Vercelli	468	9.64	48.5
Landiona	Novara	518	7.28	71.2
Lanzo Torinese	Turin	5,038	10.29	489.6
Lauriano	Turin	1,356	14.29	94.9
Leini	Turin	16,339	31.92	511.9
Lemie	Turin	153	45.68	3.3
Lenta	Vercelli	759	18.97	40.0
Lequio Berria	Cuneo	425	11.83	35.9
Lequio Tanaro	Cuneo	730	12.20	59.8
Lerma	Alessandria	797	14.54	54.8
Lesa	Novara	2,203	13.58	162.2
Lesegno	Cuneo	867	14.24	60.9
Lessolo	Turin	1,748	7.94	220.2
Lessona	Biella	2,590	12.78	202.7
Levice	Cuneo	174	15.74	11.1
Levone	Turin	476	5.39	88.3
Lignana	Vercelli	551	22.57	24.4
Limone Piemonte	Cuneo	1,329	70.81	18.8
Lisio	Cuneo	181	8.23	22.0
Livorno Ferraris	Vercelli	4,248	58.03	73.2
Loazzolo	Asti	296	14.82	20.0
Locana	Turin	1,280	132.52	9.7
Lombardore	Turin	1,735	12.72	136.4
Lombriasco	Turin	1,090	7.21	151.2
Loranzè	Turin	1,204	4.19	287.4
Loreglia	Verbano-Cusio-Ossola	197	9.15	21.5
Lozzolo	Vercelli	753	6.67	112.9
Lu e Cuccaro Monferrato	Alessandria	1,255	27.10	46.3
Luserna San Giovanni	Turin	7,118	17.74	401.2
Lusernetta	Turin	505	7.04	71.7
Lusigliè	Turin	554	5.26	105.3
Macello	Turin	1,180	14.14	83.5
Macra	Cuneo	42	24.66	1.7
Macugnaga	Verbano-Cusio-Ossola	485	99.57	4.9
Madonna del Sasso	Verbano-Cusio-Ossola	347	15.41	22.5
Maggiora	Novara	1,627	10.66	152.6
Magliano Alfieri	Cuneo	2,169	9.50	228.3
Magliano Alpi	Cuneo	2,166	33.22	65.2
Maglione	Turin	409	6.31	64.8
Magnano	Biella	339	10.56	32.1
Malesco	Verbano-Cusio-Ossola	1,339	43.18	31.0
Malvicino	Alessandria	79	9.04	8.7
Mandello Vitta	Novara	213	5.85	36.4
Mango	Cuneo	1,233	20.03	61.6
Manta	Cuneo	3,870	11.73	329.9
Mappano	Turin	7,280	9.76	745.9
Marano Ticino	Novara	1,623	7.79	208.3
Maranzana	Asti	204	4.37	46.7
Marene	Cuneo	3,367	28.99	116.1
Marentino	Turin	1,269	11.26	112.7
Maretto	Asti	370	4.93	75.1
Margarita	Cuneo	1,413	11.38	124.2
Marmora	Cuneo	56	41.13	1.4
Marsaglia	Cuneo	222	13.03	17.0
Martiniana Po	Cuneo	811	13.28	61.1
Masera	Verbano-Cusio-Ossola	1,487	20.35	73.1
Masio	Alessandria	1,276	22.23	57.4
Massazza	Biella	581	11.61	50.0
Massello	Turin	56	38.26	1.5
Masserano	Biella	1,895	27.07	70.0
Massino Visconti	Novara	1,127	6.86	164.3
Massiola	Verbano-Cusio-Ossola	103	8.06	12.8
Mathi	Turin	3,674	7.07	519.7
Mattie	Turin	679	28.69	23.7
Mazzè	Turin	4,298	27.34	157.2
Meana di Susa	Turin	787	16.54	47.6
Meina	Novara	2,340	7.54	310.3
Melazzo	Alessandria	1,236	19.74	62.6
Melle	Cuneo	293	27.91	10.5
Merana	Alessandria	172	9.20	18.7
Mercenasco	Turin	1,355	12.64	107.2
Mergozzo	Verbano-Cusio-Ossola	2,131	27.00	78.9
Mezzana Mortigliengo	Biella	475	4.31	110.2
Mezzenile	Turin	735	29.09	25.3
Mezzomerico	Novara	1,220	7.72	158.0
Miagliano	Biella	535	0.67	798.5
Miasino	Novara	805	5.52	145.8
Miazzina	Verbano-Cusio-Ossola	402	21.18	19.0
Mirabello Monferrato	Alessandria	1,204	13.24	90.9
Moasca	Asti	522	4.16	125.5
Moiola	Cuneo	212	15.07	14.1
Molare	Alessandria	1,984	32.50	61.0
Molino dei Torti	Alessandria	567	2.75	206.2
Mollia	Vercelli	100	13.92	7.2
Mombaldone	Asti	190	11.96	15.9
Mombarcaro	Cuneo	263	20.51	12.8
Mombaruzzo	Asti	892	22.40	39.8
Mombasiglio	Cuneo	562	17.35	32.4
Mombello di Torino	Turin	399	4.08	97.8
Mombello Monferrato	Alessandria	890	19.69	45.2
Mombercelli	Asti	2,038	14.23	143.2
Momo	Novara	2,405	23.59	101.9
Mompantero	Turin	612	30.33	20.2
Momperone	Alessandria	200	8.54	23.4
Monale	Asti	990	9.11	108.7
Monastero Bormida	Asti	820	14.21	57.7
Monastero di Lanzo	Turin	403	17.66	22.8
Monastero di Vasco	Cuneo	1,257	17.44	72.1
Monasterolo Casotto	Cuneo	82	7.68	10.7
Monasterolo di Savigliano	Cuneo	1,312	14.91	88.0
Moncalieri	Turin	55,442	47.53	1,166.5
Moncalvo	Asti	2,762	17.42	158.6
Moncenisio	Turin	44	4.50	9.8
Moncestino	Alessandria	194	6.52	29.8
Monchiero	Cuneo	581	4.99	116.4
Moncrivello	Vercelli	1,360	20.18	67.4
Moncucco Torinese	Asti	869	14.33	60.6
Mondovì	Cuneo	22,371	87.05	257.0
Monesiglio	Cuneo	567	12.93	43.9
Monforte d'Alba	Cuneo	1,864	25.27	73.8
Mongardino	Asti	834	6.86	121.6
Mongiardino Ligure	Alessandria	145	29.03	5.0
Mongrando	Biella	3,555	16.50	215.5
Monleale	Alessandria	552	9.62	57.4
Montà	Cuneo	4,649	26.82	173.3
Montabone	Asti	301	8.54	35.2
Montacuto	Alessandria	227	23.75	9.6
Montafia	Asti	932	14.50	64.3
Montaldeo	Alessandria	206	5.38	38.3
Montaldo Bormida	Alessandria	576	5.72	100.7
Montaldo di Mondovì	Cuneo	550	23.58	23.3
Montaldo Roero	Cuneo	894	11.84	75.5
Montaldo Scarampi	Asti	708	6.63	106.8
Montaldo Torinese	Turin	709	4.66	152.1
Montalenghe	Turin	966	6.47	149.3
Montalto Dora	Turin	3,307	7.36	449.3
Montanaro	Turin	4,974	20.90	238.0
Montanera	Cuneo	682	11.63	58.6
Montecastello	Alessandria	272	7.49	36.3
Montechiaro d'Acqui	Alessandria	509	17.60	28.9
Montechiaro d'Asti	Asti	1,221	10.14	120.4
Montecrestese	Verbano-Cusio-Ossola	1,249	86.15	14.5
Montegioco	Alessandria	271	5.45	49.7
Montegrosso d'Asti	Asti	2,320	15.42	150.5
Montelupo Albese	Cuneo	480	6.43	74.7
Montemagno	Asti	1,030	16.10	64.0
Montemale di Cuneo	Cuneo	244	11.10	22.0
Montemarzino	Alessandria	312	9.85	31.7
Monterosso Grana	Cuneo	548	42.22	13.0
Montescheno	Verbano-Cusio-Ossola	356	22.17	16.1
Monteu da Po	Turin	824	7.39	111.5
Monteu Roero	Cuneo	1,582	24.70	64.0
Montezemolo	Cuneo	229	6.94	33.0
Monticello d'Alba	Cuneo	2,333	10.24	227.8
Montiglio Monferrato	Asti	1,497	26.86	55.7
Morano sul Po	Alessandria	1,270	17.71	71.7
Moransengo-Tonengo	Asti	420	11.01	38.1
Morbello	Alessandria	388	23.95	16.2
Moretta	Cuneo	4,041	23.99	168.4
Moriondo Torinese	Turin	823	6.49	126.8
Mornese	Alessandria	666	13.22	50.4
Morozzo	Cuneo	2,032	22.19	91.6
Morsasco	Alessandria	593	10.29	57.6
Motta de' Conti	Vercelli	702	11.72	59.9
Mottalciata	Biella	1,272	18.39	69.2
Murazzano	Cuneo	841	27.68	30.4
Murello	Cuneo	936	17.33	54.0
Murisengo	Alessandria	1,210	15.31	79.0
Muzzano	Biella	551	6.10	90.3
Narzole	Cuneo	3,528	26.18	134.8
Nebbiuno	Novara	1,859	8.27	224.8
Neive	Cuneo	3,192	21.30	149.9
Netro	Biella	895	12.57	71.2
Neviglie	Cuneo	350	7.93	44.1
Nibbiola	Novara	833	11.34	73.5
Nichelino	Turin	45,680	20.56	2,221.8
Niella Belbo	Cuneo	312	11.52	27.1
Niella Tanaro	Cuneo	939	15.71	59.8
Nizza Monferrato	Asti	10,168	30.36	334.9
Noasca	Turin	97	78.05	1.2
Nole	Turin	6,660	11.35	586.8
Nomaglio	Turin	275	3.07	89.6
None	Turin	7,641	24.64	310.1
Nonio	Verbano-Cusio-Ossola	820	9.80	83.7
Novalesa	Turin	525	28.55	18.4
Novara	Novara	103,238	103.05	1,001.8
Novello	Cuneo	921	11.71	78.7
Novi Ligure	Alessandria	27,427	55.20	496.9
Nucetto	Cuneo	387	7.81	49.6
Occhieppo Inferiore	Biella	3,793	4.06	934.2
Occhieppo Superiore	Biella	2,531	5.15	491.5
Occimiano	Alessandria	1,195	22.46	53.2
Odalengo Grande	Alessandria	397	15.43	25.7
Odalengo Piccolo	Alessandria	207	7.57	27.3
Oggebbio	Verbano-Cusio-Ossola	794	21.44	37.0
Oglianico	Turin	1,419	6.30	225.2
Olcenengo	Vercelli	774	16.50	46.9
Oldenico	Vercelli	236	6.53	36.1
Oleggio	Novara	14,270	37.79	377.6
Oleggio Castello	Novara	2,225	5.94	374.6
Olivola	Alessandria	105	2.69	39.0
Olmo Gentile	Asti	67	5.62	11.9
Omegna	Verbano-Cusio-Ossola	14,182	30.37	467.0
Oncino	Cuneo	82	47.36	1.7
Orbassano	Turin	22,779	22.21	1,025.6
Orio Canavese	Turin	730	7.15	102.1
Ormea	Cuneo	1,446	124.50	11.6
Ornavasso	Verbano-Cusio-Ossola	3,301	25.92	127.4
Orsara Bormida	Alessandria	377	5.10	73.9
Orta San Giulio	Novara	1,086	6.65	163.3
Osasco	Turin	1,161	5.49	211.5
Osasio	Turin	896	4.58	195.6
Ostana	Cuneo	78	14.09	5.5
Ottiglio	Alessandria	532	14.54	36.6
Oulx	Turin	3,295	99.79	33.0
Ovada	Alessandria	10,941	35.37	309.3
Oviglio	Alessandria	1,224	27.37	44.7
Ozegna	Turin	1,164	5.41	215.2
Ozzano Monferrato	Alessandria	1,322	15.18	87.1
Paderna	Alessandria	206	4.42	46.6
Paesana	Cuneo	2,663	58.27	45.7
Pagno	Cuneo	569	8.68	65.6
Palazzo Canavese	Turin	834	5.08	164.2
Palazzolo Vercellese	Vercelli	1,088	13.94	78.0
Pallanzeno	Verbano-Cusio-Ossola	1,064	4.37	243.5
Pamparato	Cuneo	263	34.51	7.6
Pancalieri	Turin	1,945	15.89	122.4
Parella	Turin	394	2.69	146.5
Pareto	Alessandria	509	41.74	12.2
Parodi Ligure	Alessandria	593	12.54	47.3
Paroldo	Cuneo	182	12.43	14.6
Paruzzaro	Novara	2,121	5.23	405.5
Passerano Marmorito	Asti	446	12.03	37.1
Pasturana	Alessandria	1,263	5.28	239.2
Pavarolo	Turin	1,165	4.41	264.2
Pavone Canavese	Turin	3,628	11.54	314.4
Pecetto di Valenza	Alessandria	1,156	11.35	101.9
Pecetto Torinese	Turin	4,007	9.17	437.0
Pella	Novara	874	8.13	107.5
Penango	Asti	417	9.56	43.6
Perletto	Cuneo	255	9.89	25.8
Perlo	Cuneo	106	10.21	10.4
Perosa Argentina	Turin	3,138	26.09	120.3
Perosa Canavese	Turin	492	4.71	104.5
Perrero	Turin	547	63.18	8.7
Pertengo	Vercelli	331	8.30	39.9
Pertusio	Turin	744	4.00	186.0
Pessinetto	Turin	612	5.35	114.4
Pettenasco	Novara	1,296	7.07	183.3
Pettinengo	Biella	1,443	15.30	94.3
Peveragno	Cuneo	5,502	67.92	81.0
Pezzana	Vercelli	1,289	17.35	74.3
Pezzolo Valle Uzzone	Cuneo	281	26.57	10.6
Pianezza	Turin	15,657	16.46	951.2
Pianfei	Cuneo	2,093	15.31	136.7
Piasco	Cuneo	2,758	10.62	259.7
Piatto	Biella	470	3.59	130.9
Piea	Asti	489	9.00	54.3
Piedicavallo	Biella	168	17.75	9.5
Piedimulera	Verbano-Cusio-Ossola	1,426	7.57	188.4
Pietra Marazzi	Alessandria	850	8.00	106.3
Pietraporzio	Cuneo	68	55.19	1.2
Pieve Vergonte	Verbano-Cusio-Ossola	2,412	41.67	57.9
Pila	Vercelli	142	8.69	16.3
Pinasca	Turin	2,756	34.72	79.4
Pinerolo	Turin	35,436	50.34	703.9
Pino d'Asti	Asti	217	4.08	53.2
Pino Torinese	Turin	8,336	21.82	382.0
Piobesi d'Alba	Cuneo	1,469	4.03	364.5
Piobesi Torinese	Turin	3,764	19.65	191.6
Piode	Vercelli	193	13.60	14.2
Piossasco	Turin	17,844	40.15	444.4
Piovà Massaia	Asti	557	10.14	54.9
Piozzo	Cuneo	991	14.30	69.3
Pisano	Novara	794	2.77	286.6
Piscina	Turin	3,288	9.90	332.1
Piverone	Turin	1,224	11.03	111.0
Pocapaglia	Cuneo	3,306	17.48	189.1
Pogno	Novara	1,365	9.87	138.3
Poirino	Turin	10,165	75.62	134.4
Pollone	Biella	1,947	16.22	120.0
Polonghera	Cuneo	1,119	10.31	108.5
Pomaretto	Turin	935	8.56	109.2
Pomaro Monferrato	Alessandria	329	13.44	24.5
Pombia	Novara	2,119	12.30	172.3
Ponderano	Biella	3,608	7.05	511.8
Pont-Canavese	Turin	3,017	19.06	158.3
Pontechianale	Cuneo	187	94.92	2.0
Pontecurone	Alessandria	3,570	29.70	120.2
Pontestura	Alessandria	1,317	18.92	69.6
Ponti	Alessandria	491	11.97	41.0
Ponzano Monferrato	Alessandria	328	11.65	28.2
Ponzone	Alessandria	1,013	69.03	14.7
Portacomaro	Asti	1,891	11.00	171.9
Porte	Turin	1,113	4.45	250.1
Portula	Biella	1,077	11.31	95.2
Postua	Vercelli	521	16.18	32.2
Pozzol Groppo	Alessandria	311	14.08	22.1
Pozzolo Formigaro	Alessandria	4,558	36.18	126.0
Pradleves	Cuneo	262	19.29	13.6
Pragelato	Turin	694	89.20	7.8
Prali	Turin	251	72.61	3.5
Pralormo	Turin	1,872	29.85	62.7
Pralungo	Biella	2,293	7.25	316.3
Pramollo	Turin	211	22.48	9.4
Prarolo	Vercelli	720	11.54	62.4
Prarostino	Turin	1,238	10.51	117.8
Prasco	Alessandria	501	5.97	83.9
Prascorsano	Turin	686	6.24	109.9
Pratiglione	Turin	444	7.88	56.3
Prato Sesia	Novara	1,829	12.13	150.8
Pray	Biella	1,999	9.18	217.8
Prazzo	Cuneo	166	52.39	3.2
Predosa	Alessandria	1,860	33.01	56.3
Premeno	Verbano-Cusio-Ossola	732	7.88	92.9
Premia	Verbano-Cusio-Ossola	568	88.90	6.4
Premosello-Chiovenda	Verbano-Cusio-Ossola	1,864	34.16	54.6
Priero	Cuneo	486	20.01	24.3
Priocca	Cuneo	2,016	9.03	223.3
Priola	Cuneo	609	27.37	22.3
Prunetto	Cuneo	369	14.36	25.7
Quagliuzzo	Turin	333	2.04	163.2
Quaranti	Asti	144	2.86	50.3
Quaregna Cerreto	Biella	2,045	8.41	243.2
Quargnento	Alessandria	1,362	36.17	37.7
Quarna Sopra	Verbano-Cusio-Ossola	240	9.39	25.6
Quarna Sotto	Verbano-Cusio-Ossola	373	16.37	22.8
Quarona	Vercelli	3,715	16.16	229.9
Quassolo	Turin	329	3.96	83.1
Quattordio	Alessandria	1,435	17.73	80.9
Quincinetto	Turin	991	17.79	55.7
Quinto Vercellese	Vercelli	381	10.90	35.0
Racconigi	Cuneo	9,626	48.06	200.3
Rassa	Vercelli	66	43.27	1.5
Re	Verbano-Cusio-Ossola	707	27.15	26.0
Reano	Turin	1,779	6.67	266.7
Recetto	Novara	1,029	8.85	116.3
Refrancore	Asti	1,535	13.21	116.2
Revello	Cuneo	4,184	52.47	79.7
Revigliasco d'Asti	Asti	752	8.84	85.1
Ribordone	Turin	43	43.60	1.0
Ricaldone	Alessandria	604	10.52	57.4
Rifreddo	Cuneo	1,014	6.84	148.2
Rimella	Vercelli	139	26.27	5.3
Rittana	Cuneo	98	11.35	8.6
Riva presso Chieri	Turin	4,756	35.83	132.7
Rivalba	Turin	1,135	10.83	104.8
Rivalta Bormida	Alessandria	1,332	10.05	132.5
Rivalta di Torino	Turin	20,019	25.11	797.3
Rivara	Turin	2,421	12.58	192.4
Rivarolo Canavese	Turin	12,303	32.25	381.5
Rivarone	Alessandria	400	6.07	65.9
Rivarossa	Turin	1,550	10.87	142.6
Rive	Vercelli	427	9.41	45.4
Rivoli	Turin	46,551	29.50	1,578.0
Roaschia	Cuneo	87	23.84	3.6
Roascio	Cuneo	83	6.42	12.9
Roasio	Vercelli	2,142	27.92	76.7
Roatto	Asti	350	6.42	54.5
Robassomero	Turin	3,056	8.58	356.2
Robella	Asti	440	12.18	36.1
Robilante	Cuneo	2,103	25.00	84.1
Roburent	Cuneo	487	29.81	16.3
Rocca Canavese	Turin	1,727	14.19	121.7
Rocca Cigliè	Cuneo	124	7.02	17.7
Rocca d'Arazzo	Asti	935	12.56	74.4
Rocca de' Baldi	Cuneo	1,615	26.40	61.2
Rocca Grimalda	Alessandria	1,396	15.46	90.3
Roccabruna	Cuneo	1,519	24.30	62.5
Roccaforte Ligure	Alessandria	113	20.59	5.5
Roccaforte Mondovì	Cuneo	2,132	84.61	25.2
Roccasparvera	Cuneo	744	11.24	66.2
Roccaverano	Asti	360	29.98	12.0
Roccavione	Cuneo	2,610	19.15	136.3
Rocchetta Belbo	Cuneo	150	4.51	33.3
Rocchetta Ligure	Alessandria	222	10.15	21.9
Rocchetta Palafea	Asti	320	7.84	40.8
Rocchetta Tanaro	Asti	1,357	15.91	85.3
Roddi	Cuneo	1,591	9.35	170.2
Roddino	Cuneo	394	10.59	37.2
Rodello	Cuneo	959	8.90	107.8
Roletto	Turin	1,965	9.70	202.6
Romagnano Sesia	Novara	3,759	17.98	209.1
Romano Canavese	Turin	2,711	11.21	241.8
Romentino	Novara	5,658	17.69	319.8
Ronco Biellese	Biella	1,409	3.85	366.0
Ronco Canavese	Turin	383	96.27	4.0
Rondissone	Turin	1,927	10.69	180.3
Ronsecco	Vercelli	560	24.48	22.9
Roppolo	Biella	805	8.65	93.1
Rorà	Turin	216	12.41	17.4
Rosazza	Biella	95	9.02	10.5
Rosignano Monferrato	Alessandria	1,387	19.28	71.9
Rossa	Vercelli	167	11.84	14.1
Rossana	Cuneo	836	19.92	42.0
Rosta	Turin	5,074	9.07	559.4
Roure	Turin	740	59.37	12.5
Rovasenda	Vercelli	885	29.27	30.2
Rubiana	Turin	2,591	26.94	96.2
Rueglio	Turin	788	15.10	52.2
Ruffia	Cuneo	357	7.51	47.5
Sagliano Micca	Biella	1,594	14.61	109.1
Sala Biellese	Biella	531	8.03	66.1
Sala Monferrato	Alessandria	326	7.58	43.0
Salasco	Vercelli	194	12.19	15.9
Salassa	Turin	1,850	4.95	373.7
Salbertrand	Turin	635	38.32	16.6
Sale	Alessandria	3,853	44.92	85.8
Sale delle Langhe	Cuneo	473	10.51	45.0
Sale San Giovanni	Cuneo	151	8.07	18.7
Salerano Canavese	Turin	471	2.10	224.3
Sali Vercellese	Vercelli	88	8.78	10.0
Saliceto	Cuneo	1,144	24.33	47.0
Salmour	Cuneo	719	12.70	56.6
Saluggia	Vercelli	3,752	31.60	118.7
Salussola	Biella	1,835	38.52	47.6
Saluzzo	Cuneo	17,575	79.93	219.9
Salza di Pinerolo	Turin	65	15.89	4.1
Sambuco	Cuneo	81	46.14	1.8
Samone	Turin	1,538	2.43	632.9
Sampeyre	Cuneo	967	98.91	9.8
San Benedetto Belbo	Cuneo	141	4.85	29.1
San Benigno Canavese	Turin	6,050	22.23	272.2
San Bernardino Verbano	Verbano-Cusio-Ossola	1,226	26.68	46.0
San Carlo Canavese	Turin	4,029	20.91	192.7
San Colombano Belmonte	Turin	359	3.38	106.2
San Cristoforo	Alessandria	519	3.57	145.4
San Damiano d'Asti	Asti	8,040	47.87	168.0
San Damiano Macra	Cuneo	402	54.26	7.4
San Didero	Turin	493	3.30	149.4
San Francesco al Campo	Turin	4,805	14.98	320.8
San Germano Chisone	Turin	1,689	15.86	106.5
San Germano Vercellese	Vercelli	1,615	30.63	52.7
San Giacomo Vercellese	Vercelli	263	9.60	27.4
San Gillio	Turin	3,311	8.89	372.4
San Giorgio Canavese	Turin	2,484	20.41	121.7
San Giorgio Monferrato	Alessandria	1,204	7.12	169.1
San Giorgio Scarampi	Asti	98	6.15	15.9
San Giorio di Susa	Turin	951	19.74	48.2
San Giusto Canavese	Turin	3,309	9.61	344.3
San Martino Alfieri	Asti	661	7.21	91.7
San Martino Canavese	Turin	798	9.79	81.5
San Marzano Oliveto	Asti	930	9.68	96.1
San Maurizio Canavese	Turin	10,252	17.34	591.2
San Maurizio d'Opaglio	Novara	2,931	8.51	344.4
San Mauro Torinese	Turin	18,267	12.55	1,455.5
San Michele Mondovì	Cuneo	1,896	18.11	104.7
San Nazzaro Sesia	Novara	701	11.45	61.2
San Paolo Solbrito	Asti	1,163	11.87	98.0
San Pietro Mosezzo	Novara	1,960	34.90	56.2
San Pietro Val Lemina	Turin	1,437	12.44	115.5
San Ponso	Turin	230	2.12	108.5
San Raffaele Cimena	Turin	3,128	11.15	280.5
San Salvatore Monferrato	Alessandria	4,053	31.69	127.9
San Sebastiano Curone	Alessandria	530	3.89	136.2
San Sebastiano da Po	Turin	1,853	16.58	111.8
San Secondo di Pinerolo	Turin	3,638	12.57	289.4
Sandigliano	Biella	2,563	10.22	250.8
Sanfrè	Cuneo	3,051	15.50	196.8
Sanfront	Cuneo	2,253	39.71	56.7
Sangano	Turin	3,624	6.65	545.0
Sant'Agata Fossili	Alessandria	337	7.71	43.7
Sant'Albano Stura	Cuneo	2,420	27.45	88.2
Sant'Ambrogio di Torino	Turin	4,501	8.37	537.8
Sant'Antonino di Susa	Turin	4,073	9.79	416.0
Santa Maria Maggiore	Verbano-Cusio-Ossola	1,305	53.71	24.3
Santa Vittoria d'Alba	Cuneo	2,928	10.08	290.5
Santena	Turin	10,373	16.20	640.3
Santhià	Vercelli	8,024	53.13	151.0
Santo Stefano Belbo	Cuneo	3,686	27.18	135.6
Santo Stefano Roero	Cuneo	1,346	13.11	102.7
Sardigliano	Alessandria	375	12.74	29.4
Sarezzano	Alessandria	1,096	13.85	79.1
Sauze d'Oulx	Turin	1,018	17.31	58.8
Sauze di Cesana	Turin	227	78.28	2.9
Savigliano	Cuneo	21,761	110.79	196.4
Scagnello	Cuneo	166	9.39	17.7
Scalenghe	Turin	3,199	31.68	101.0
Scarmagno	Turin	785	8.03	97.8
Scarnafigi	Cuneo	2,087	30.50	68.4
Sciolze	Turin	1,424	11.36	125.4
Scopa	Vercelli	381	22.53	16.9
Scopello	Vercelli	388	18.25	21.3
Scurzolengo	Asti	522	5.34	97.8
Serole	Asti	96	12.33	7.8
Serralunga d'Alba	Cuneo	484	8.39	57.7
Serralunga di Crea	Alessandria	510	8.84	57.7
Serravalle Langhe	Cuneo	324	8.90	36.4
Serravalle Scrivia	Alessandria	6,004	15.95	376.4
Serravalle Sesia	Vercelli	4,636	20.91	221.7
Sessame	Asti	222	8.45	26.3
Sestriere	Turin	893	25.92	34.5
Settime	Asti	531	6.68	79.5
Settimo Rottaro	Turin	469	6.06	77.4
Settimo Torinese	Turin	45,566	31.45	1,448.8
Settimo Vittone	Turin	1,507	23.26	64.8
Sezzadio	Alessandria	1,185	34.32	34.5
Sillavengo	Novara	576	9.54	60.4
Silvano d'Orba	Alessandria	1,839	12.17	151.1
Sinio	Cuneo	471	8.60	54.8
Sizzano	Novara	1,320	10.75	122.8
Soglio	Asti	128	3.28	39.0
Solero	Alessandria	1,581	22.55	70.1
Solonghello	Alessandria	196	4.95	39.6
Somano	Cuneo	322	11.69	27.5
Sommariva del Bosco	Cuneo	6,272	35.42	177.1
Sommariva Perno	Cuneo	2,675	17.09	156.5
Sordevolo	Biella	1,260	13.74	91.7
Soriso	Novara	722	6.37	113.3
Sostegno	Biella	732	18.07	40.5
Sozzago	Novara	1,105	12.92	85.5
Sparone	Turin	903	29.68	30.4
Spigno Monferrato	Alessandria	887	54.86	16.2
Spineto Scrivia	Alessandria	356	3.95	90.1
Stazzano	Alessandria	2,259	17.91	126.1
Strambinello	Turin	236	2.21	106.8
Strambino	Turin	6,018	22.47	267.8
Stresa	Verbano-Cusio-Ossola	4,548	35.36	128.6
Strevi	Alessandria	1,940	15.29	126.9
Strona	Biella	941	3.72	253.0
Stroppiana	Vercelli	1,199	18.31	65.5
Stroppo	Cuneo	102	28.10	3.6
Suno	Novara	2,662	21.33	124.8
Susa	Turin	5,776	10.99	525.6
Tagliolo Monferrato	Alessandria	1,460	26.21	55.7
Tarantasca	Cuneo	2,219	12.20	181.9
Tassarolo	Alessandria	594	7.04	84.4
Tavagnasco	Turin	747	8.68	86.1
Tavigliano	Biella	884	11.24	78.6
Terdobbiate	Novara	462	8.46	54.6
Ternengo	Biella	264	1.98	133.3
Terruggia	Alessandria	860	7.27	118.3
Terzo	Alessandria	817	8.80	92.8
Ticineto	Alessandria	1,297	8.09	160.3
Tigliole	Asti	1,739	16.12	107.9
Toceno	Verbano-Cusio-Ossola	765	15.77	48.5
Tollegno	Biella	2,342	3.31	707.6
Tonco	Asti	762	11.78	64.7
Tornaco	Novara	876	13.24	66.2
Torrazza Piemonte	Turin	2,997	9.82	305.2
Torrazzo	Biella	192	5.77	33.3
Torre Bormida	Cuneo	190	7.18	26.5
Torre Canavese	Turin	597	5.45	109.5
Torre Mondovì	Cuneo	509	18.54	27.5
Torre Pellice	Turin	4,585	21.10	217.3
Torre San Giorgio	Cuneo	698	5.39	129.5
Torresina	Cuneo	48	3.82	12.6
Tortona	Alessandria	26,643	98.87	269.5
Trana	Turin	3,744	16.41	228.2
Trarego Viggiona	Verbano-Cusio-Ossola	383	18.90	20.3
Trasquera	Verbano-Cusio-Ossola	173	39.60	4.4
Traversella	Turin	309	39.36	7.9
Traves	Turin	505	10.45	48.3
Trecate	Novara	21,305	38.22	557.4
Treiso	Cuneo	734	9.60	76.5
Treville	Alessandria	263	4.60	57.2
Trezzo Tinella	Cuneo	289	10.53	27.4
Tricerro	Vercelli	661	12.25	54.0
Trinità	Cuneo	2,322	28.34	81.9
Trino	Vercelli	6,760	70.61	95.7
Trisobbio	Alessandria	621	9.22	67.4
Trofarello	Turin	10,501	12.35	850.3
Trontano	Verbano-Cusio-Ossola	1,667	56.74	29.4
Tronzano Vercellese	Vercelli	3,271	44.75	73.1
Turin	Turin	855,654	130.01	6,581.4
Usseaux	Turin	177	37.97	4.7
Usseglio	Turin	179	98.54	1.8
Vaglio Serra	Asti	260	4.76	54.6
Vaie	Turin	1,317	7.23	182.2
Val della Torre	Turin	3,973	36.53	108.8
Val di Chy	Turin	1,225	13.83	88.6
Valchiusa	Turin	1,012	49.61	20.4
Valdengo	Biella	2,341	7.68	304.8
Valdieri	Cuneo	911	153.32	5.9
Valdilana	Biella	9,880	61.13	161.6
Valduggia	Vercelli	1,785	28.43	62.8
Valenza	Alessandria	18,313	48.49	377.7
Valfenera	Asti	2,445	22.04	110.9
Valgioie	Turin	983	9.12	107.8
Valgrana	Cuneo	790	23.10	34.2
Vallanzengo	Biella	189	4.67	40.5
Valle Cannobina	Verbano-Cusio-Ossola	416	55.18	7.5
Valle San Nicolao	Biella	815	13.26	61.5
Vallo Torinese	Turin	784	6.08	128.9
Valloriate	Cuneo	92	16.96	5.4
Valmacca	Alessandria	973	12.29	79.2
Valperga	Turin	2,977	11.91	250.0
Valprato Soana	Turin	88	71.85	1.2
Valstrona	Verbano-Cusio-Ossola	1,111	51.89	21.4
Vanzone con San Carlo	Verbano-Cusio-Ossola	397	15.73	25.2
Vaprio d'Agogna	Novara	952	10.01	95.1
Varallo	Vercelli	6,832	102.97	66.3
Varallo Pombia	Novara	5,023	13.61	369.1
Varisella	Turin	828	22.56	36.7
Varzo	Verbano-Cusio-Ossola	1,896	93.77	20.2
Vauda Canavese	Turin	1,417	7.09	199.9
Veglio	Biella	421	6.41	65.7
Venaria Reale	Turin	31,886	20.44	1,560.0
Venasca	Cuneo	1,335	20.39	65.5
Venaus	Turin	843	19.14	44.0
Verbania	Verbano-Cusio-Ossola	29,825	37.49	795.5
Vercelli	Vercelli	46,391	79.78	581.5
Verduno	Cuneo	553	7.16	77.2
Vernante	Cuneo	1,079	62.06	17.4
Verolengo	Turin	4,788	29.49	162.4
Verrone	Biella	1,160	8.59	135.0
Verrua Savoia	Turin	1,353	31.94	42.4
Verzuolo	Cuneo	6,519	26.13	249.5
Vesime	Asti	582	13.17	44.2
Vespolate	Novara	2,080	17.78	117.0
Vestignè	Turin	752	12.07	62.3
Vezza d'Alba	Cuneo	2,377	14.07	168.9
Viale	Asti	227	3.98	57.0
Vialfrè	Turin	258	4.65	55.5
Viarigi	Asti	807	13.62	59.3
Vicoforte	Cuneo	3,187	25.74	123.8
Vicolungo	Novara	851	13.29	64.0
Vidracco	Turin	450	2.97	151.5
Vigliano Biellese	Biella	7,577	8.40	902.0
Vigliano d'Asti	Asti	792	6.65	119.1
Vignale Monferrato	Alessandria	926	18.73	49.4
Vignole Borbera	Alessandria	2,066	8.65	238.8
Vignolo	Cuneo	2,690	7.94	338.8
Vignone	Verbano-Cusio-Ossola	1,187	3.38	351.2
Vigone	Turin	5,046	41.15	122.6
Viguzzolo	Alessandria	3,094	18.31	169.0
Villa del Bosco	Biella	312	3.70	84.3
Villa San Secondo	Asti	388	6.13	63.3
Villadeati	Alessandria	454	14.61	31.1
Villadossola	Verbano-Cusio-Ossola	6,249	18.73	333.6
Villafalletto	Cuneo	2,918	29.73	98.2
Villafranca d'Asti	Asti	2,959	12.88	229.7
Villafranca Piemonte	Turin	4,585	50.79	90.3
Villalvernia	Alessandria	846	4.47	189.3
Villamiroglio	Alessandria	283	9.87	28.7
Villanova Biellese	Biella	173	7.87	22.0
Villanova Canavese	Turin	1,199	4.03	297.5
Villanova d'Asti	Asti	5,507	41.95	131.3
Villanova Mondovì	Cuneo	6,038	28.29	213.4
Villanova Monferrato	Alessandria	1,701	16.56	102.7
Villanova Solaro	Cuneo	725	14.79	49.0
Villar Dora	Turin	2,793	5.71	489.1
Villar Focchiardo	Turin	1,943	25.69	75.6
Villar Pellice	Turin	1,052	60.29	17.4
Villar Perosa	Turin	3,892	11.42	340.8
Villar San Costanzo	Cuneo	1,548	19.50	79.4
Villarbasse	Turin	3,521	10.41	338.2
Villarboit	Vercelli	366	25.51	14.3
Villareggia	Turin	994	11.41	87.1
Villaromagnano	Alessandria	650	6.07	107.1
Villastellone	Turin	4,286	19.88	215.6
Villata	Vercelli	1,518	14.58	104.1
Villette	Verbano-Cusio-Ossola	270	7.38	36.6
Vinadio	Cuneo	566	183.17	3.1
Vinchio	Asti	531	9.29	57.2
Vinovo	Turin	15,290	17.69	864.3
Vinzaglio	Novara	564	15.46	36.5
Viola	Cuneo	383	21.07	18.2
Virle Piemonte	Turin	1,188	14.06	84.5
Vische	Turin	1,206	17.08	70.6
Visone	Alessandria	1,169	12.56	93.1
Vistrorio	Turin	526	4.68	112.4
Viù	Turin	1,075	84.11	12.8
Viverone	Biella	1,318	12.26	107.5
Vocca	Vercelli	156	20.26	7.7
Vogogna	Verbano-Cusio-Ossola	1,669	15.62	106.9
Volpedo	Alessandria	1,135	10.48	108.3
Volpeglino	Alessandria	129	3.25	39.7
Volpiano	Turin	15,060	32.46	464.0
Voltaggio	Alessandria	649	52.18	12.4
Volvera	Turin	8,417	20.98	401.2
Vottignasco	Cuneo	507	8.09	62.7
Zimone	Biella	377	2.95	127.8
Zubiena	Biella	1,138	12.47	91.3
Zumaglia	Biella	959	2.61	367.4

== See also ==
- List of municipalities of Italy
