= List of municipalities of the Province of Cuneo =

The following is a list of the 247 municipalities (comuni) of the Province of Cuneo in the region of Piedmont in Italy.

== List ==
Municipality	Population (2026)	Area (km^{2})	Density
Acceglio	171	151.53	1.1
Aisone	206	36.92	5.6
Alba	30,985	53.59	578.2
Albaretto della Torre	205	4.59	44.7
Alto	152	7.46	20.4
Argentera	76	76.26	1.0
Arguello	190	4.92	38.6
Bagnasco	929	30.95	30.0
Bagnolo Piemonte	5,685	63.25	89.9
Baldissero d'Alba	1,043	15.33	68.0
Barbaresco	600	7.76	77.3
Barge	7,510	81.99	91.6
Barolo	613	5.69	107.7
Bastia Mondovì	628	12.00	52.3
Battifollo	256	11.12	23.0
Beinette	3,540	17.69	200.1
Bellino	99	62.07	1.6
Belvedere Langhe	333	5.00	66.6
Bene Vagienna	3,645	48.97	74.4
Benevello	457	5.44	84.0
Bergolo	51	3.11	16.4
Bernezzo	4,276	25.84	165.5
Bonvicino	102	7.24	14.1
Borgo San Dalmazzo	12,618	22.34	564.8
Borgomale	372	8.48	43.9
Bosia	168	5.54	30.3
Bossolasco	664	14.55	45.6
Boves	9,612	50.95	188.7
Bra	29,830	59.53	501.1
Briaglia	311	6.24	49.8
Briga Alta	41	52.18	0.8
Brondello	260	10.12	25.7
Brossasco	979	28.06	34.9
Busca	10,228	76.77	133.2
Camerana	551	23.64	23.3
Canale	5,404	17.87	302.4
Canosio	76	48.45	1.6
Caprauna	78	11.50	6.8
Caraglio	6,842	41.68	164.2
Caramagna Piemonte	3,013	26.33	114.4
Cardè	1,174	19.31	60.8
Carrù	4,494	25.84	173.9
Cartignano	161	6.42	25.1
Casalgrasso	1,458	17.81	81.9
Castagnito	2,294	7.11	322.6
Casteldelfino	143	33.95	4.2
Castelletto Stura	1,377	17.13	80.4
Castelletto Uzzone	277	14.86	18.6
Castellinaldo	911	7.80	116.8
Castellino Tanaro	273	11.52	23.7
Castelmagno	51	49.31	1.0
Castelnuovo di Ceva	102	6.26	16.3
Castiglione Falletto	655	4.72	138.8
Castiglione Tinella	746	11.63	64.1
Castino	431	15.52	27.8
Cavallerleone	664	16.44	40.4
Cavallermaggiore	5,329	51.60	103.3
Celle di Macra	83	31.11	2.7
Centallo	6,985	42.49	164.4
Ceresole Alba	1,975	37.05	53.3
Cerretto Langhe	387	10.14	38.2
Cervasca	5,190	18.24	284.5
Cervere	2,280	18.60	122.6
Ceva	5,895	43.17	136.6
Cherasco	9,713	81.54	119.1
Chiusa di Pesio	3,716	95.02	39.1
Cigliè	196	6.12	32.0
Cissone	76	5.90	12.9
Clavesana	775	17.15	45.2
Corneliano d'Alba	2,167	10.09	214.8
Cortemilia	2,104	24.99	84.2
Cossano Belbo	858	20.54	41.8
Costigliole Saluzzo	3,307	15.34	215.6
Cravanzana	344	8.12	42.4
Crissolo	132	52.05	2.5
Cuneo	55,747	119.67	465.8
Demonte	1,848	127.31	14.5
Diano d'Alba	3,547	17.54	202.2
Dogliani	4,605	35.68	129.1
Dronero	7,007	58.96	118.8
Elva	80	26.22	3.1
Entracque	741	160.73	4.6
Envie	1,952	24.93	78.3
Farigliano	1,698	16.44	103.3
Faule	474	7.03	67.4
Feisoglio	288	7.67	37.5
Fossano	24,157	130.15	185.6
Frabosa Soprana	740	47.14	15.7
Frabosa Sottana	1,644	37.64	43.7
Frassino	250	17.01	14.7
Gaiola	574	4.97	115.5
Gambasca	376	5.74	65.5
Garessio	2,833	131.29	21.6
Genola	2,564	13.72	186.9
Gorzegno	239	13.97	17.1
Gottasecca	116	13.68	8.5
Govone	2,233	18.91	118.1
Grinzane Cavour	1,938	3.81	508.7
Guarene	3,548	13.45	263.8
Igliano	63	3.40	18.5
Isasca	63	5.08	12.4
La Morra	2,626	24.17	108.6
Lagnasco	1,384	17.71	78.1
Lequio Berria	425	11.83	35.9
Lequio Tanaro	730	12.20	59.8
Lesegno	867	14.24	60.9
Levice	174	15.74	11.1
Limone Piemonte	1,329	70.81	18.8
Lisio	181	8.23	22.0
Macra	42	24.66	1.7
Magliano Alfieri	2,169	9.50	228.3
Magliano Alpi	2,166	33.22	65.2
Mango	1,233	20.03	61.6
Manta	3,870	11.73	329.9
Marene	3,367	28.99	116.1
Margarita	1,413	11.38	124.2
Marmora	56	41.13	1.4
Marsaglia	222	13.03	17.0
Martiniana Po	811	13.28	61.1
Melle	293	27.91	10.5
Moiola	212	15.07	14.1
Mombarcaro	263	20.51	12.8
Mombasiglio	562	17.35	32.4
Monastero di Vasco	1,257	17.44	72.1
Monasterolo Casotto	82	7.68	10.7
Monasterolo di Savigliano	1,312	14.91	88.0
Monchiero	581	4.99	116.4
Mondovì	22,371	87.05	257.0
Monesiglio	567	12.93	43.9
Monforte d'Alba	1,864	25.27	73.8
Montà	4,649	26.82	173.3
Montaldo di Mondovì	550	23.58	23.3
Montaldo Roero	894	11.84	75.5
Montanera	682	11.63	58.6
Montelupo Albese	480	6.43	74.7
Montemale di Cuneo	244	11.10	22.0
Monterosso Grana	548	42.22	13.0
Monteu Roero	1,582	24.70	64.0
Montezemolo	229	6.94	33.0
Monticello d'Alba	2,333	10.24	227.8
Moretta	4,041	23.99	168.4
Morozzo	2,032	22.19	91.6
Murazzano	841	27.68	30.4
Murello	936	17.33	54.0
Narzole	3,528	26.18	134.8
Neive	3,192	21.30	149.9
Neviglie	350	7.93	44.1
Niella Belbo	312	11.52	27.1
Niella Tanaro	939	15.71	59.8
Novello	921	11.71	78.7
Nucetto	387	7.81	49.6
Oncino	82	47.36	1.7
Ormea	1,446	124.50	11.6
Ostana	78	14.09	5.5
Paesana	2,663	58.27	45.7
Pagno	569	8.68	65.6
Pamparato	263	34.51	7.6
Paroldo	182	12.43	14.6
Perletto	255	9.89	25.8
Perlo	106	10.21	10.4
Peveragno	5,502	67.92	81.0
Pezzolo Valle Uzzone	281	26.57	10.6
Pianfei	2,093	15.31	136.7
Piasco	2,758	10.62	259.7
Pietraporzio	68	55.19	1.2
Piobesi d'Alba	1,469	4.03	364.5
Piozzo	991	14.30	69.3
Pocapaglia	3,306	17.48	189.1
Polonghera	1,119	10.31	108.5
Pontechianale	187	94.92	2.0
Pradleves	262	19.29	13.6
Prazzo	166	52.39	3.2
Priero	486	20.01	24.3
Priocca	2,016	9.03	223.3
Priola	609	27.37	22.3
Prunetto	369	14.36	25.7
Racconigi	9,626	48.06	200.3
Revello	4,184	52.47	79.7
Rifreddo	1,014	6.84	148.2
Rittana	98	11.35	8.6
Roaschia	87	23.84	3.6
Roascio	83	6.42	12.9
Robilante	2,103	25.00	84.1
Roburent	487	29.81	16.3
Rocca Cigliè	124	7.02	17.7
Rocca de' Baldi	1,615	26.40	61.2
Roccabruna	1,519	24.30	62.5
Roccaforte Mondovì	2,132	84.61	25.2
Roccasparvera	744	11.24	66.2
Roccavione	2,610	19.15	136.3
Rocchetta Belbo	150	4.51	33.3
Roddi	1,591	9.35	170.2
Roddino	394	10.59	37.2
Rodello	959	8.90	107.8
Rossana	836	19.92	42.0
Ruffia	357	7.51	47.5
Sale delle Langhe	473	10.51	45.0
Sale San Giovanni	151	8.07	18.7
Saliceto	1,144	24.33	47.0
Salmour	719	12.70	56.6
Saluzzo	17,575	79.93	219.9
Sambuco	81	46.14	1.8
Sampeyre	967	98.91	9.8
San Benedetto Belbo	141	4.85	29.1
San Damiano Macra	402	54.26	7.4
San Michele Mondovì	1,896	18.11	104.7
Sanfrè	3,051	15.50	196.8
Sanfront	2,253	39.71	56.7
Sant'Albano Stura	2,420	27.45	88.2
Santa Vittoria d'Alba	2,928	10.08	290.5
Santo Stefano Belbo	3,686	27.18	135.6
Santo Stefano Roero	1,346	13.11	102.7
Savigliano	21,761	110.79	196.4
Scagnello	166	9.39	17.7
Scarnafigi	2,087	30.50	68.4
Serralunga d'Alba	484	8.39	57.7
Serravalle Langhe	324	8.90	36.4
Sinio	471	8.60	54.8
Somano	322	11.69	27.5
Sommariva del Bosco	6,272	35.42	177.1
Sommariva Perno	2,675	17.09	156.5
Stroppo	102	28.10	3.6
Tarantasca	2,219	12.20	181.9
Torre Bormida	190	7.18	26.5
Torre Mondovì	509	18.54	27.5
Torre San Giorgio	698	5.39	129.5
Torresina	48	3.82	12.6
Treiso	734	9.60	76.5
Trezzo Tinella	289	10.53	27.4
Trinità	2,322	28.34	81.9
Valdieri	911	153.32	5.9
Valgrana	790	23.10	34.2
Valloriate	92	16.96	5.4
Venasca	1,335	20.39	65.5
Verduno	553	7.16	77.2
Vernante	1,079	62.06	17.4
Verzuolo	6,519	26.13	249.5
Vezza d'Alba	2,377	14.07	168.9
Vicoforte	3,187	25.74	123.8
Vignolo	2,690	7.94	338.8
Villafalletto	2,918	29.73	98.2
Villanova Mondovì	6,038	28.29	213.4
Villanova Solaro	725	14.79	49.0
Villar San Costanzo	1,548	19.50	79.4
Vinadio	566	183.17	3.1
Viola	383	21.07	18.2
Vottignasco	507	8.09	62.7

== See also ==
- List of municipalities of Piedmont
- List of municipalities of Italy
