= Piana Crixia =

Piana Crixia A Ciana (Ligurian)
- Comune
- Comune di Piana Crixia
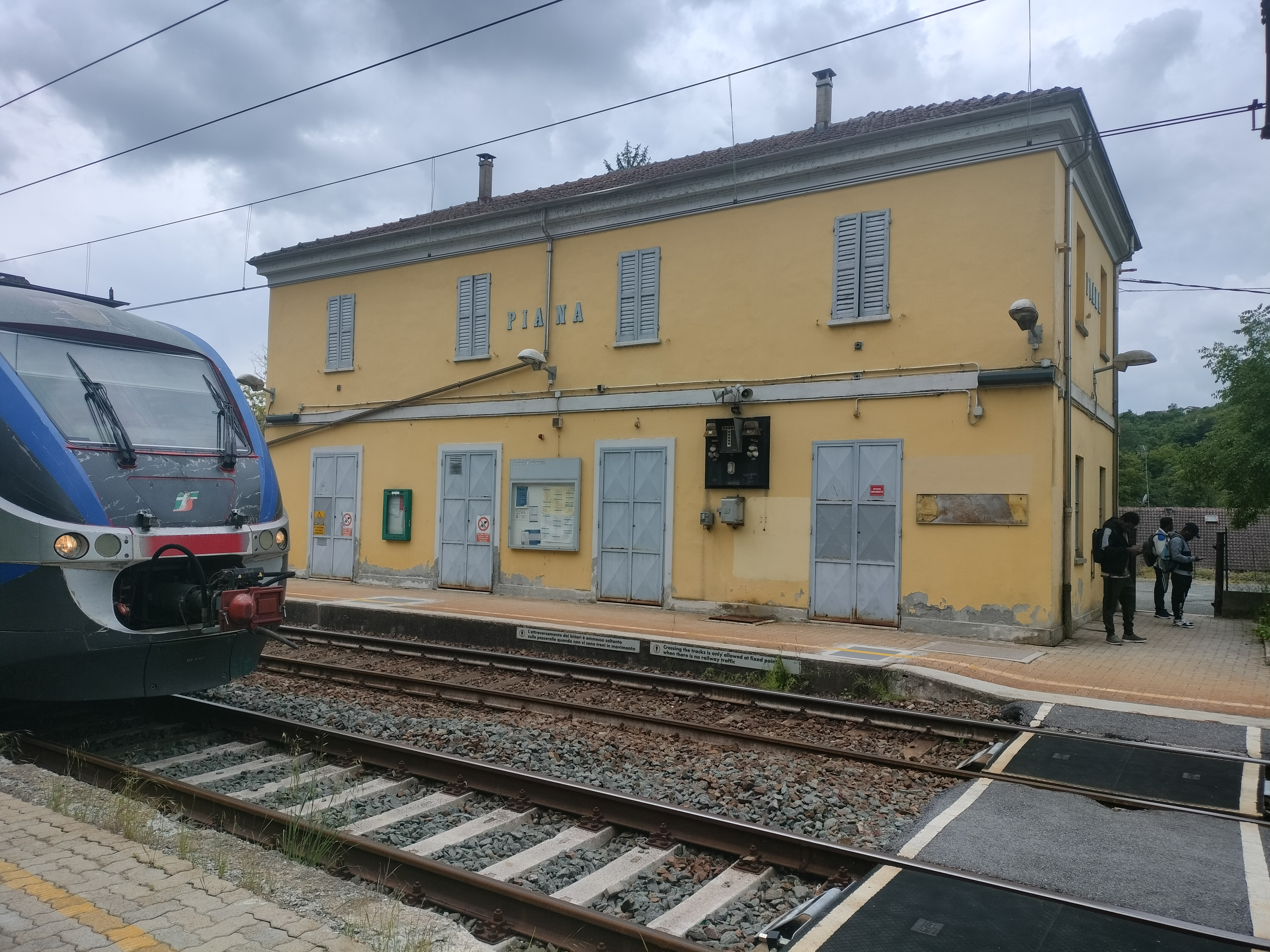
- Piana Crixia train station

- Coat of arms

- Location within Italy Location within Liguria
- Coordinates: 44°28′N 8°19′E
- Country: Italy
- Region: Liguria
- Province: Province of Savona (SV)

Area
  - Total: 29.6 km^{2} (11.4 sq mi)

Population (Dec. 2004)
  - Total: 826
  - Density: 27.9/km^{2} (72.3/sq mi)
- Time zone: UTC+1 (CET)
  - Summer (DST): UTC+2 (CEST)
- Postal code: 17010
- Dialing code: 019

Piana Crixia (Italian: [ˈpjaːna ˈkriːzja]; Ligurian: A Ciana; Piedmontese: Pion) is a comune (municipality) in the Province of Savona in the Italian region Liguria, located about 50 kilometres (31 mi) west of Genoa and about 25 kilometres (16 mi) northwest of Savona. As of 31 December 2004, it had a population of 826 and an area of 29.6 square kilometres (11.4 mi^{2}).

Piana Crixia borders the following municipalities: Castelletto Uzzone, Dego, Merana, Pezzolo Valle Uzzone, Serole, and Spigno Monferrato.

== Demographic evolution ==
Historical population

Year	Pop.	±%
1861	1,553	—
1871	1,492	−3.9%
1881	1,411	−5.4%
1901	1,487	+5.4%
1911	1,527	+2.7%

Year	Pop.	±%
1921	1,601	+4.8%
1931	1,575	−1.6%
1936	1,582	+0.4%
1951	1,605	+1.5%
1961	1,299	−19.1%

Year	Pop.	±%
1971	995	−23.4%
1981	830	−16.6%
1991	838	+1.0%
2001	816	−2.6%

Source: Data from ISTAT

== Twin towns ==
Piana Crixia is twinned with:

- Saint-Jodard, France (2001)
