= Lusernetta =

- Comune
- Comune di Lusernetta
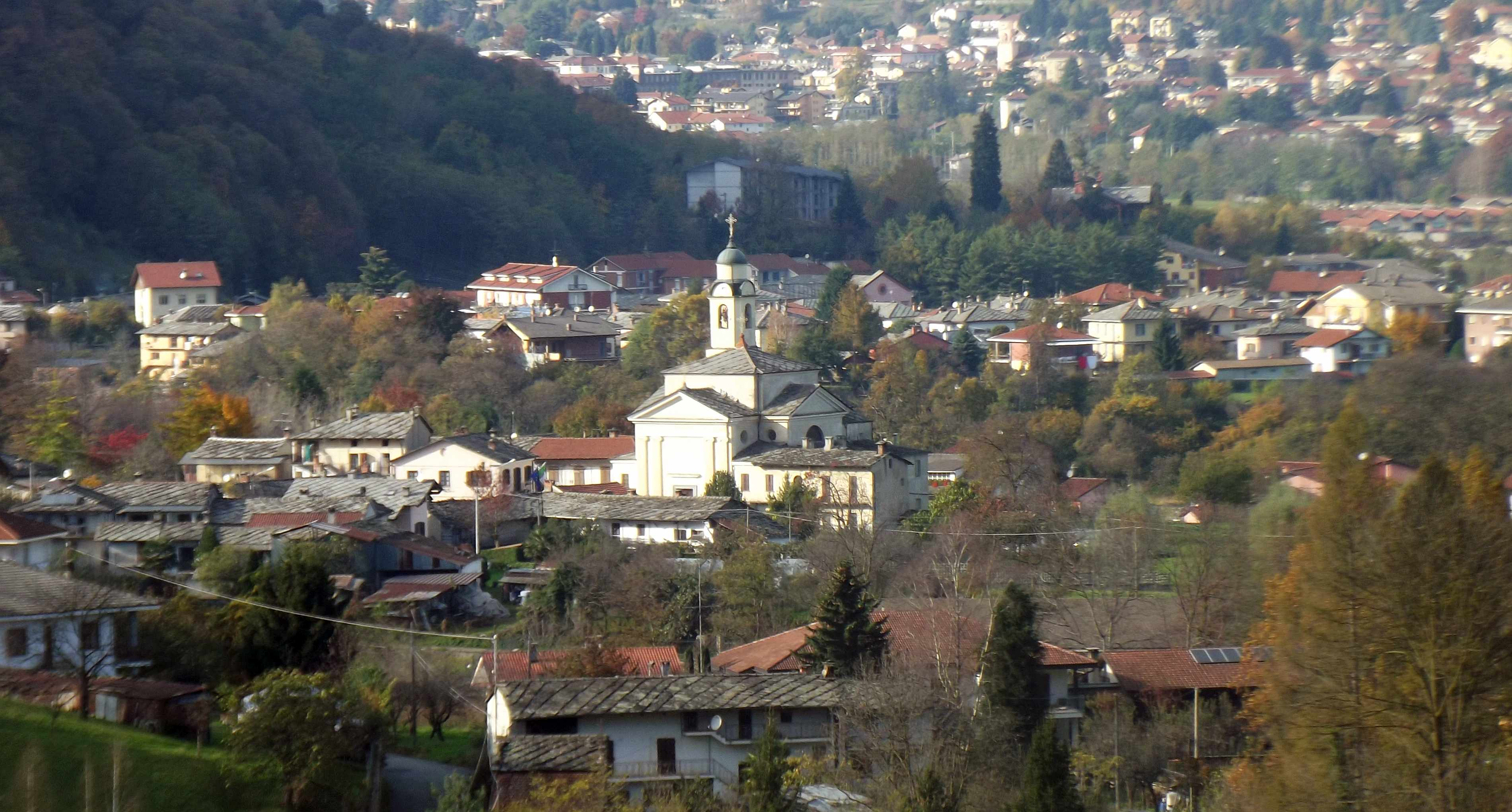

- Location within Italy Location within Piedmont
- Coordinates: 44°48′N 7°15′E
- Country: Italy
- Region: Piedmont
- Metropolitan city: Turin (TO)

Government
  - Mayor: Alex Maurino

Area
  - Total: 7.2 km^{2} (2.8 sq mi)
- Elevation: 507 m (1,663 ft)

Population (30 September 2017)
  - Total: 489
  - Density: 68/km^{2} (180/sq mi)
- Demonym: Lusernettesi
- Time zone: UTC+1 (CET)
  - Summer (DST): UTC+2 (CEST)
- Postal code: 10060
- Dialing code: 0121

Lusernetta is a comune (municipality) in the Metropolitan City of Turin in the Italian region Piedmont, located about 45 kilometres (28 mi) southwest of Turin.

Lusernetta borders the following municipalities: Luserna San Giovanni and Bibiana.
