= Mombarcaro =

- Comune
- Comune di Mombarcaro
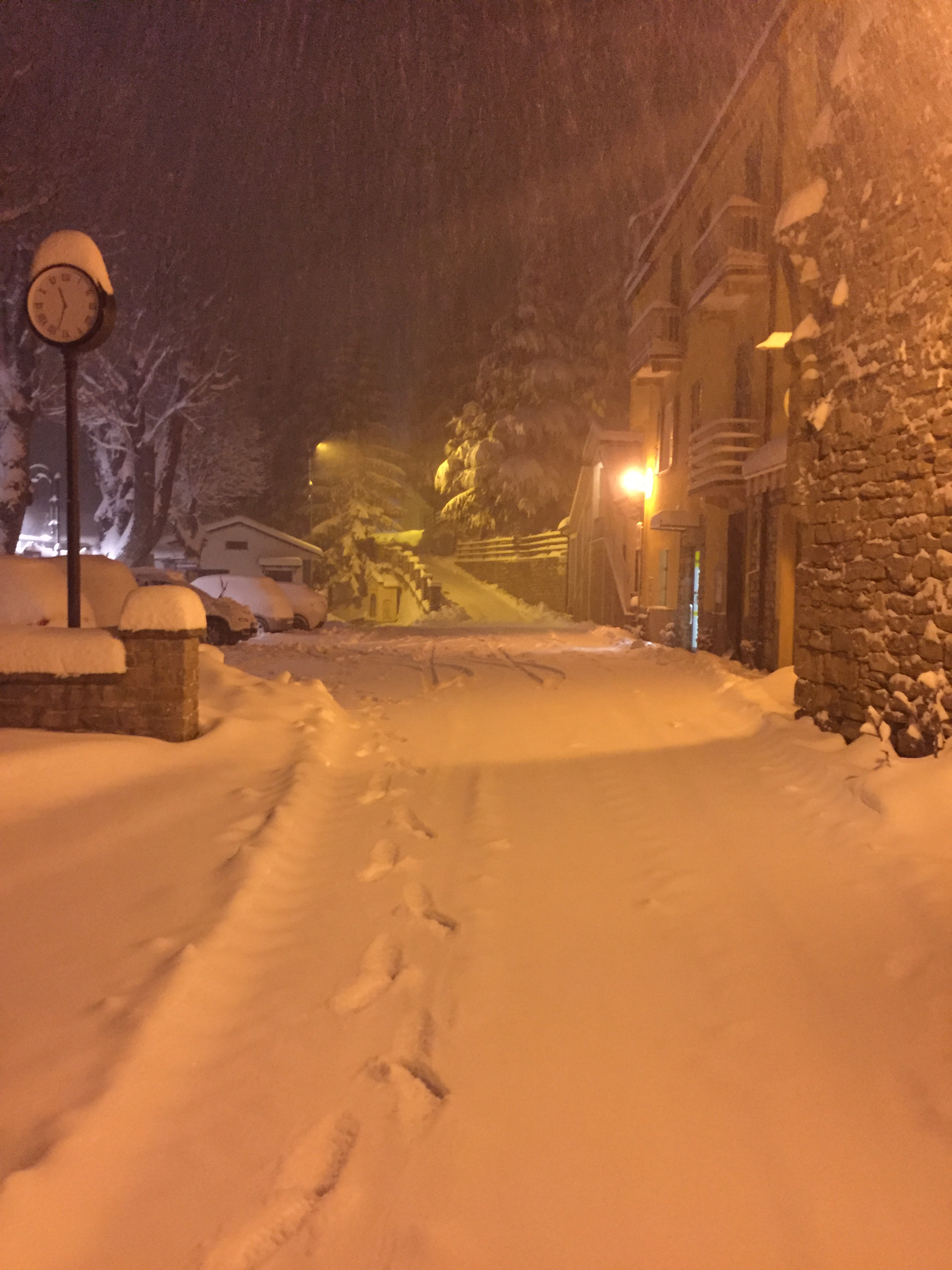

- Location within Italy Location within Piedmont
- Coordinates: 44°28′N 8°5′E
- Country: Italy
- Region: Piedmont
- Province: Province of Cuneo (CN)

Area
  - Total: 20.4 km^{2} (7.9 sq mi)

Population (Dec. 2004)
  - Total: 319
  - Density: 15.6/km^{2} (40.5/sq mi)
- Time zone: UTC+1 (CET)
  - Summer (DST): UTC+2 (CEST)
- Postal code: 12070
- Dialing code: 0174

Mombarcaro is a comune (municipality) in the Province of Cuneo in the Italian region Piedmont, located about 70 kilometres (43 mi) southeast of Turin and about 45 kilometres (28 mi) east of Cuneo. As of 31 December 2004, it had a population of 319 and an area of 20.4 square kilometres (7.9 mi^{2}).

Mombarcaro borders the following municipalities: Camerana, Gorzegno, Monesiglio, Murazzano, Niella Belbo, Paroldo, Prunetto, Sale San Giovanni, and San Benedetto Belbo.

== Demographic evolution ==
Historical population

Year	Pop.	±%
1861	1,108	—
1871	1,236	+11.6%
1881	1,153	−6.7%
1901	1,090	−5.5%
1911	1,081	−0.8%

Year	Pop.	±%
1921	1,094	+1.2%
1931	1,213	+10.9%
1936	1,231	+1.5%
1951	1,203	−2.3%
1961	802	−33.3%

Year	Pop.	±%
1971	558	−30.4%
1981	431	−22.8%
1991	370	−14.2%
2001	320	−13.5%

Source: Data from ISTAT
