= Bergolo =

- Comune
- Comune di Bergolo
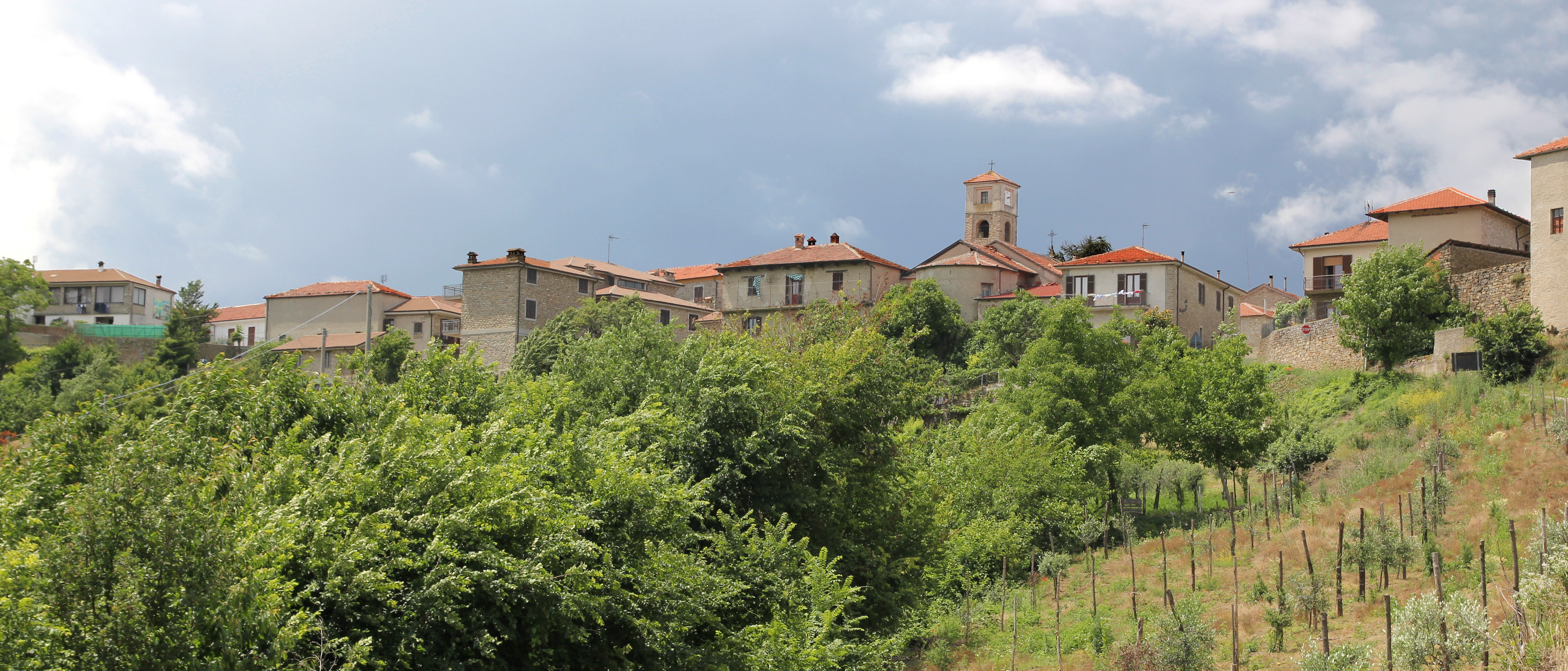

- Location within Italy Location within Piedmont
- Coordinates: 44°32′N 8°11′E
- Country: Italy
- Region: Piedmont
- Province: Province of Cuneo (CN)

Government
  - Mayor: Mario Marone (Civic List)

Area
  - Total: 3.0 km^{2} (1.2 sq mi)
- Elevation: 616 m (2,021 ft)

Population (1-1-2017)
  - Total: 68
  - Density: 23/km^{2} (59/sq mi)
- Demonym: Bergolese(i)
- Time zone: UTC+1 (CET)
  - Summer (DST): UTC+2 (CEST)
- Postal code: 12074
- Dialing code: 0173
- Website: Official website

Bergolo is a comune (municipality) in the Province of Cuneo in the Italian region Piedmont, located about 70 kilometres (43 mi) southeast of Turin and about 50 kilometres (31 mi) northeast of Cuneo. As of 1 January 2017, it had a population of 68 and an area of 3.0 square kilometres (1.2 mi^{2}).

Bergolo borders the following municipalities: Cortemilia, Levice, Pezzolo Valle Uzzone, and Torre Bormida.

== Demographic evolution ==
Historical population
Year	Pop.	±%
1861	209	—
1871	244	+16.7%
1881	228	−6.6%
1901	277	+21.5%
1911	271	−2.2%
1921	262	−3.3%
1931	285	+8.8%
1936	261	−8.4%
1951	245	−6.1%
1961	204	−16.7%
1971	108	−47.1%
1981	77	−28.7%
1991	73	−5.2%
2001	79	+8.2%
Source: Data from ISTAT

== Comital title ==
The Bergolo estates were part of the minor aristocracy in the Italian nobility of relatively recent heritage (the comital title Count Calvi of Bergolo having been created in 1787). Members of the Calvi di Bergolo line include General Giorgio Carlo Calvi di Bèrgolo (1887–1977), consort of Princess Yolanda of Savoy, sister of Umberto II, the last king of Italy; Princess Mafalda of Savoy, wife of the Prince of Hesse, who died at Buchenwald concentration camp in 1944; and the painter Gregorio Calvi di Bergolo (1904–1994), who created the Hall of Murals in Chicago's International Surgical Museum.
