= Feisoglio =

- Comune
- Comune di Feisoglio
- Location within Italy Location within Piedmont
- Coordinates: 44°33′N 8°6′E
- Country: Italy
- Region: Piedmont
- Province: Province of Cuneo (CN)

Area
  - Total: 7.4 km^{2} (2.9 sq mi)

Population (Dec. 2004)
  - Total: 383
  - Density: 52/km^{2} (130/sq mi)
- Time zone: UTC+1 (CET)
  - Summer (DST): UTC+2 (CEST)
- Postal code: 12050
- Dialing code: 0173

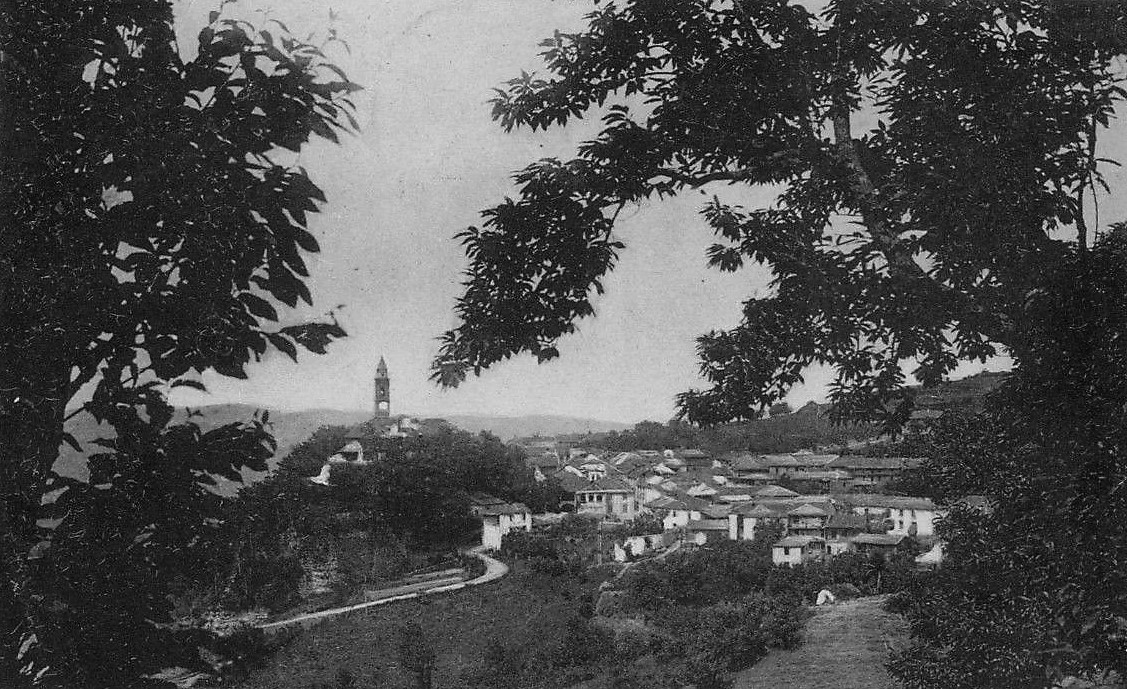
Feisoglio in a vintage postcard (1932)

Feisoglio is a comune (municipality) in the Province of Cuneo in the Italian region Piedmont, located about 70 kilometres (43 mi) southeast of Turin and about 50 kilometres (31 mi) northeast of Cuneo. As of 31 December 2004, it had a population of 383 and an area of 7.4 square kilometres (2.9 mi^{2}).

Feisoglio borders the following municipalities: Bossolasco, Cerreto Langhe, Cravanzana, Gorzegno, Levice, Niella Belbo, Serravalle Langhe, and Torre Bormida.
