= Monesiglio =

- Comune
- Comune di Monesiglio
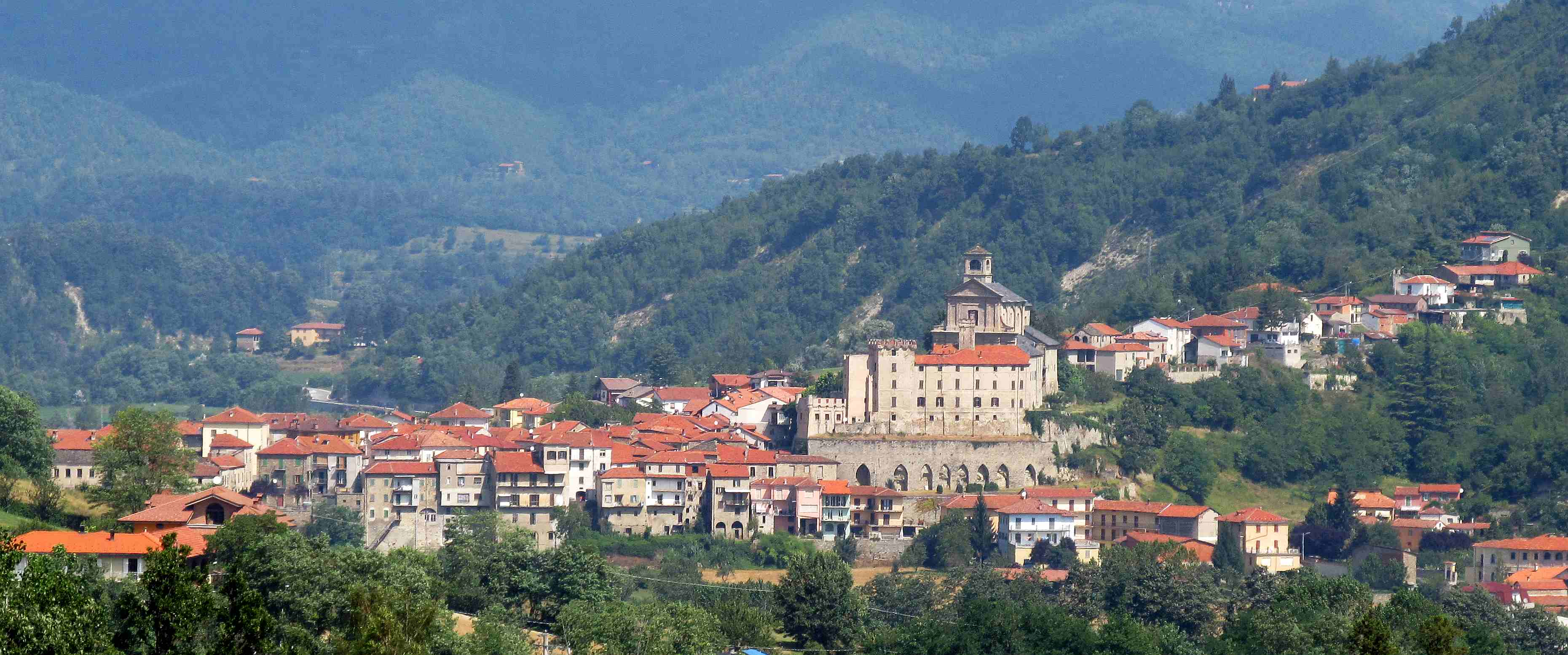

- Coat of arms

- Location within Italy Location within Piedmont
- Coordinates: 44°28′N 8°7′E
- Country: Italy
- Region: Piedmont
- Province: Cuneo (CN)

Government
  - Mayor: Carlo Rosso

Area
  - Total: 12.8 km^{2} (4.9 sq mi)
- Elevation: 372 m (1,220 ft)

Population (31 August 2007)
  - Total: 765
  - Density: 59.8/km^{2} (155/sq mi)
- Demonym: Monesigliesi
- Time zone: UTC+1 (CET)
  - Summer (DST): UTC+2 (CEST)
- Postal code: 12077
- Dialing code: 0174
- Patron saint: St. Andrew
- Saint day: 30 November

Monesiglio is a comune (municipality) in the Province of Cuneo in the Italian region Piedmont, located about 70 kilometres (43 mi) southeast of Turin and about 45 kilometres (28 mi) east of Cuneo.

Monesiglio borders the following municipalities: Camerana, Gottasecca, Mombarcaro, and Prunetto. It is home to a castle, built in the 13th century, later (17th century) rebuilt into a late-Gothic palace. It houses several 16th-century frescoes.
