= Torre Bormida =

- Comune
- Comune di Torre Bormida
- Location within Italy Location within Piedmont
- Coordinates: 44°34′N 8°9′E
- Country: Italy
- Region: Piedmont
- Province: Cuneo (CN)

Government
  - Mayor: Andrea Rizzolo

Area
  - Total: 7.7 km^{2} (3.0 sq mi)
- Elevation: 391 m (1,283 ft)

Population (31 December 2010)
  - Total: 210
  - Density: 27/km^{2} (71/sq mi)
- Demonym: Torrebormidesi
- Time zone: UTC+1 (CET)
  - Summer (DST): UTC+2 (CEST)
- Postal code: 12070
- Dialing code: 0173

Torre Bormida is a comune (municipality) in the Province of Cuneo in the Italian region Piedmont, located about 70 kilometres (43 mi) southeast of Turin and about 50 kilometres (31 mi) northeast of Cuneo.

Torre Bormida borders the following municipalities: Bergolo, Bosia, Cortemilia, Cravanzana, Feisoglio, and Levice.

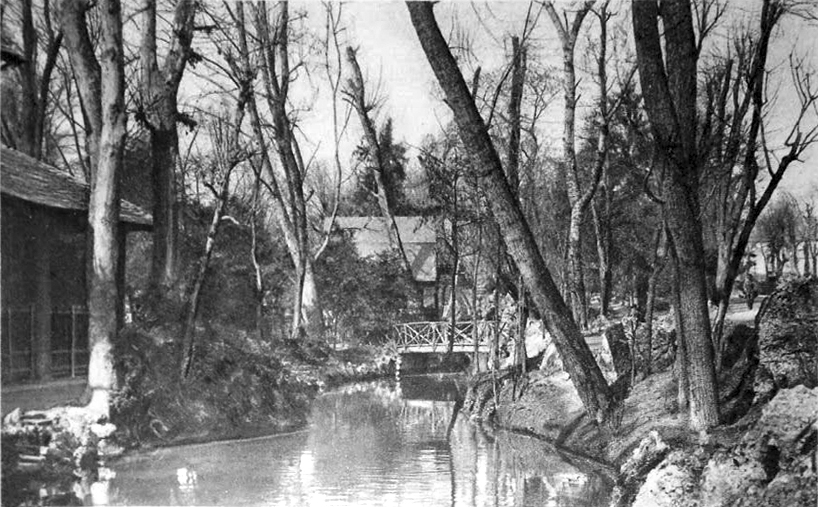
