= Camerana =

- Comune
- Comune di Camerana
- Coat of arms

- Location within Italy Location within Piedmont
- Coordinates: 44°25′N 8°8′E
- Country: Italy
- Region: Piedmont
- Province: Cuneo (CN)

Government
  - Mayor: Pietro Giacomo Viglino

Area
  - Total: 23.9 km^{2} (9.2 sq mi)
- Elevation: 525 m (1,722 ft)

Population (31 July 2009)
  - Total: 679
  - Density: 28.4/km^{2} (73.6/sq mi)
- Demonym: Cameranesi
- Time zone: UTC+1 (CET)
  - Summer (DST): UTC+2 (CEST)
- Postal code: 12072
- Dialing code: 0174

Camerana is a comune (municipality) in the Province of Cuneo in the Italian region Piedmont, located about 80 kilometres (50 mi) southeast of Turin and about 45 kilometres (28 mi) east of Cuneo.

Camerana borders the following municipalities: Gottasecca, Mombarcaro, Monesiglio, Montezemolo, Sale delle Langhe, Sale San Giovanni, and Saliceto.
