= Prunetto =

- Comune
- Comune di Prunetto
- Location within Italy Location within Piedmont
- Coordinates: 44°29′N 8°9′E
- Country: Italy
- Region: Piedmont
- Province: Province of Cuneo (CN)

Area
  - Total: 14.5 km^{2} (5.6 sq mi)

Population (Dec. 2004)
  - Total: 492
  - Density: 33.9/km^{2} (87.9/sq mi)
- Time zone: UTC+1 (CET)
  - Summer (DST): UTC+2 (CEST)
- Postal code: 12070
- Dialing code: 0174

Prunetto is a comune (municipality) in the Province of Cuneo in the Italian region Piedmont, located about 70 kilometres (43 mi) southeast of Turin and about 50 kilometres (31 mi) east of Cuneo. As of 31 December 2004, it had a population of 492 and an area of 14.5 square kilometres (5.6 mi^{2}). The Communities are predominantly farming based.

Prunetto borders the following municipalities: Castelletto Uzzone, Gorzegno, Gottasecca, Levice, Mombarcaro, and Monesiglio.

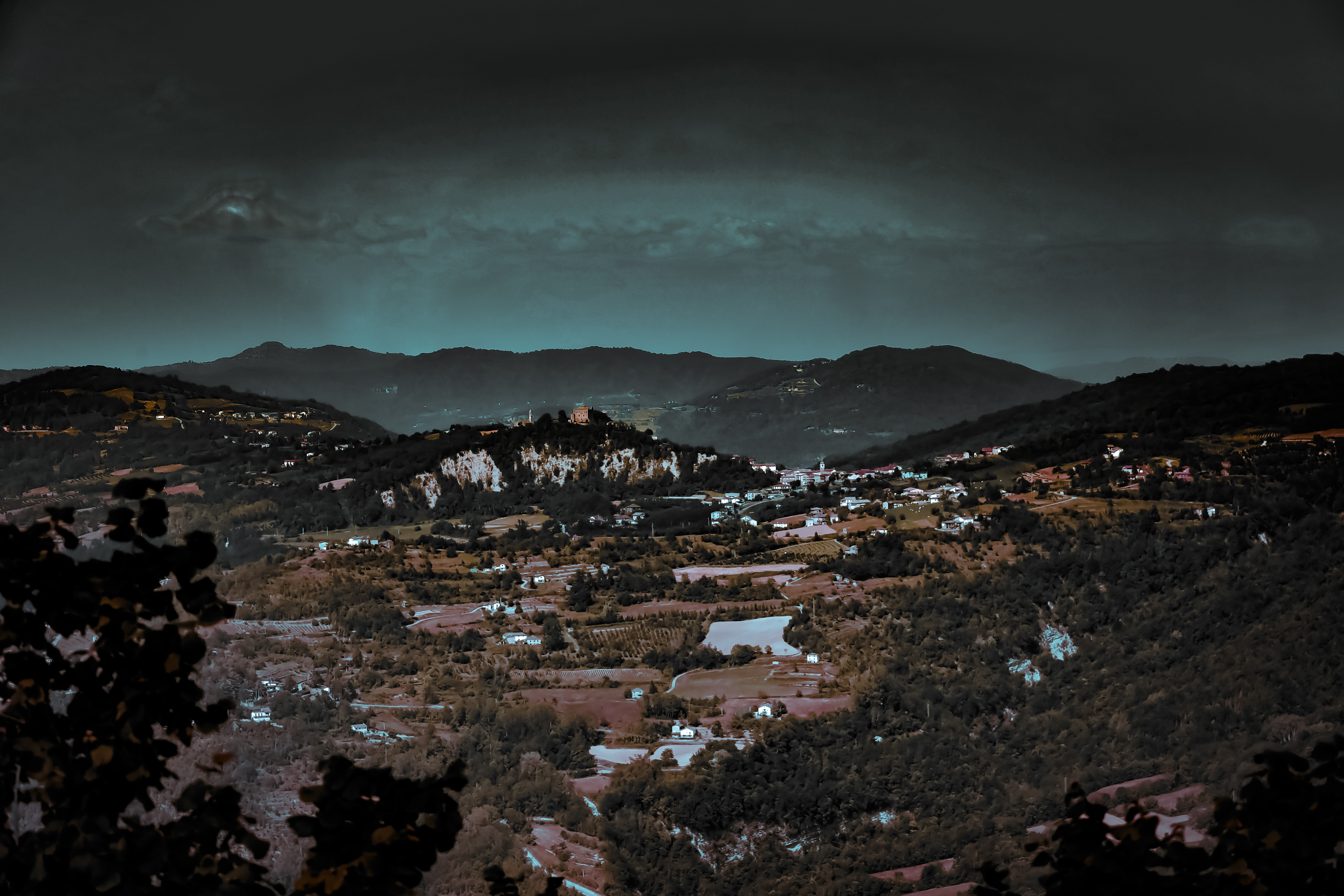
Prunetto 2022 Tiberius Sanders

== Demographic evolution ==
Historical population

Year	Pop.	±%
1861	1,224	—
1871	1,211	−1.1%
1881	1,116	−7.8%
1901	1,249	+11.9%
1911	1,190	−4.7%

Year	Pop.	±%
1921	1,237	+3.9%
1931	1,318	+6.5%
1936	1,285	−2.5%
1951	1,189	−7.5%
1961	948	−20.3%

Year	Pop.	±%
1971	785	−17.2%
1981	637	−18.9%
1991	502	−21.2%
2001	492	−2.0%

Source: Data from ISTAT
