= Gorzegno =

- Comune
- Comune di Gorzegno
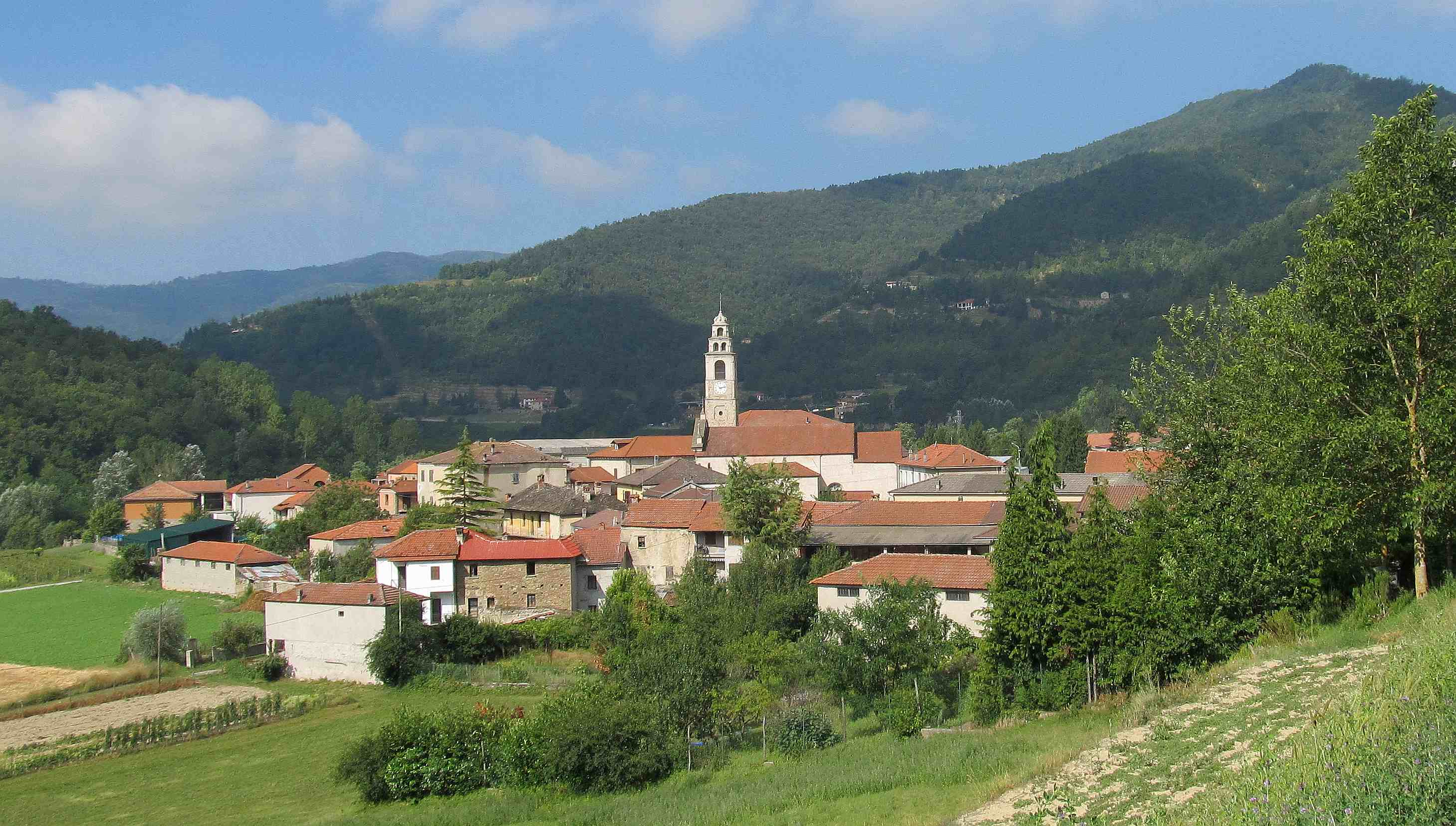

- Location within Italy Location within Piedmont
- Coordinates: 44°31′N 8°8′E
- Country: Italy
- Region: Piedmont
- Province: Province of Cuneo (CN)

Area
  - Total: 13.8 km^{2} (5.3 sq mi)

Population (Dec. 2004)
  - Total: 362
  - Density: 26.2/km^{2} (67.9/sq mi)
- Time zone: UTC+1 (CET)
  - Summer (DST): UTC+2 (CEST)
- Postal code: 12070
- Dialing code: 0173

Gorzegno is a comune (municipality) in the Province of Cuneo in the Italian region Piedmont, located about 70 kilometres (43 mi) southeast of Turin and about 50 kilometres (31 mi) northeast of Cuneo. As of 31 December 2004, it had a population of 362 and an area of 13.8 square kilometres (5.3 mi^{2}).

Gorzegno borders the following municipalities: Feisoglio, Levice, Mombarcaro, Niella Belbo, and Prunetto.

== Demographic evolution ==
Historical population

Year	Pop.	±%
1861	1,172	—
1871	1,158	−1.2%
1881	1,234	+6.6%
1901	1,289	+4.5%
1911	1,187	−7.9%
1921	1,233	+3.9%

Year	Pop.	±%
1931	1,191	−3.4%
1936	1,183	−0.7%
1951	1,003	−15.2%
1961	727	−27.5%
1971	508	−30.1%
1981	459	−9.6%

Year	Pop.	±%
1991	441	−3.9%
2001	393	−10.9%
2011	322	−18.1%
2021	255	−20.8%

Source: Data from ISTAT
