= Levice, Piedmont =

Levice
- Comune
- Comune di Levice
- Location within Italy Location within Piedmont
- Coordinates: 44°32′N 8°9′E
- Country: Italy
- Region: Piedmont
- Province: Province of Cuneo (CN)

Area
  - Total: 15.4 km^{2} (5.9 sq mi)

Population (Dec. 2004)
  - Total: 242
  - Density: 15.7/km^{2} (40.7/sq mi)
- Demonym: Levicesi
- Time zone: UTC+1 (CET)
  - Summer (DST): UTC+2 (CEST)
- Postal code: 12070
- Dialing code: 0173

Levice is a comune (municipality) in the Province of Cuneo in the Italian region Piedmont, located about 70 kilometres (43 mi) southeast of Turin and about 50 kilometres (31 mi) northeast of Cuneo. As of 31 December 2004, it had a population of 242 and an area of 15.4 square kilometres (5.9 mi^{2}).

Levice borders the following municipalities: Bergolo, Castelletto Uzzone, Feisoglio, Gorzegno, Pezzolo Valle Uzzone, Prunetto, and Torre Bormida.

== Demographic evolution ==
Historical population

| Year | Pop. | ±% |
|---|---|---|
| 1861 | 1,102 | — |
| 1871 | 1,150 | +4.4% |
| 1881 | 1,138 | −1.0% |
| 1901 | 1,163 | +2.2% |
| 1911 | 1,157 | −0.5% |

| Year | Pop. | ±% |
|---|---|---|
| 1921 | 1,230 | +6.3% |
| 1931 | 1,177 | −4.3% |
| 1936 | 1,112 | −5.5% |
| 1951 | 980 | −11.9% |
| 1961 | 720 | −26.5% |

| Year | Pop. | ±% |
|---|---|---|
| 1971 | 535 | −25.7% |
| 1981 | 392 | −26.7% |
| 1991 | 344 | −12.2% |
| 2001 | 270 | −21.5% |

Source: Data from ISTAT
