= Saliceto, Piedmont =

Saliceto
- Comune
- Comune di Saliceto
- Coat of arms

- Location within Italy Location within Piedmont
- Coordinates: 44°25′N 8°10′E
- Country: Italy
- Region: Piedmont
- Province: Cuneo (CN)

Government
  - Mayor: Enrico Pregliasco

Area
  - Total: 24.4 km^{2} (9.4 sq mi)
- Elevation: 389 m (1,276 ft)

Population (31 December 2012)
  - Total: 1,403
  - Density: 57.5/km^{2} (149/sq mi)
- Demonym: Salicetesi
- Time zone: UTC+1 (CET)
  - Summer (DST): UTC+2 (CEST)
- Postal code: 12079
- Dialing code: 0174
- Website: Official website

Saliceto (Piedmontese: Sarzèj) is a commune in the province of Cuneo, and the region of Piedmont, Italy, located about 80 kilometres (50 mi) southeast of Turin and about 50 kilometres (31 mi) east of Cuneo.

Saliceto borders the following municipalities: Cairo Montenotte, Camerana, Cengio, Gottasecca, and Montezemolo.

Historically Saliceto was a possession of the Del Carretto marquises of Finale Ligure, who built a castle here in 1588. The castle was besieged in 1689 by Spanish troops.

== Twin towns ==
- Saliceto, France
