= Castelletto Uzzone =

- Comune
- Comune di Castelletto Uzzone
- Coat of arms

- Location within Italy Location within Piedmont
- Coordinates: 44°30′N 8°11′E
- Country: Italy
- Region: Piedmont
- Province: Cuneo (CN)

Government
  - Mayor: Gabriele Molinari

Area
  - Total: 15.1 km^{2} (5.8 sq mi)
- Elevation: 425 m (1,394 ft)

Population (31 July 2010)
  - Total: 367
  - Density: 24.3/km^{2} (62.9/sq mi)
- Demonym: Castellettesi
- Time zone: UTC+1 (CET)
  - Summer (DST): UTC+2 (CEST)
- Postal code: 12070
- Dialing code: 0173

Castelletto Uzzone is a comune (municipality) in the Province of Cuneo in the Italian region Piedmont, located about 70 kilometres (43 mi) southeast of Turin and about 50 kilometres (31 mi) east of Cuneo. Castelletto Uzzone borders the following municipalities: Dego, Gottasecca, Levice, Pezzolo Valle Uzzone, Piana Crixia, and Prunetto.
