= Sale San Giovanni =

- Comune
- Comune di Sale San Giovanni
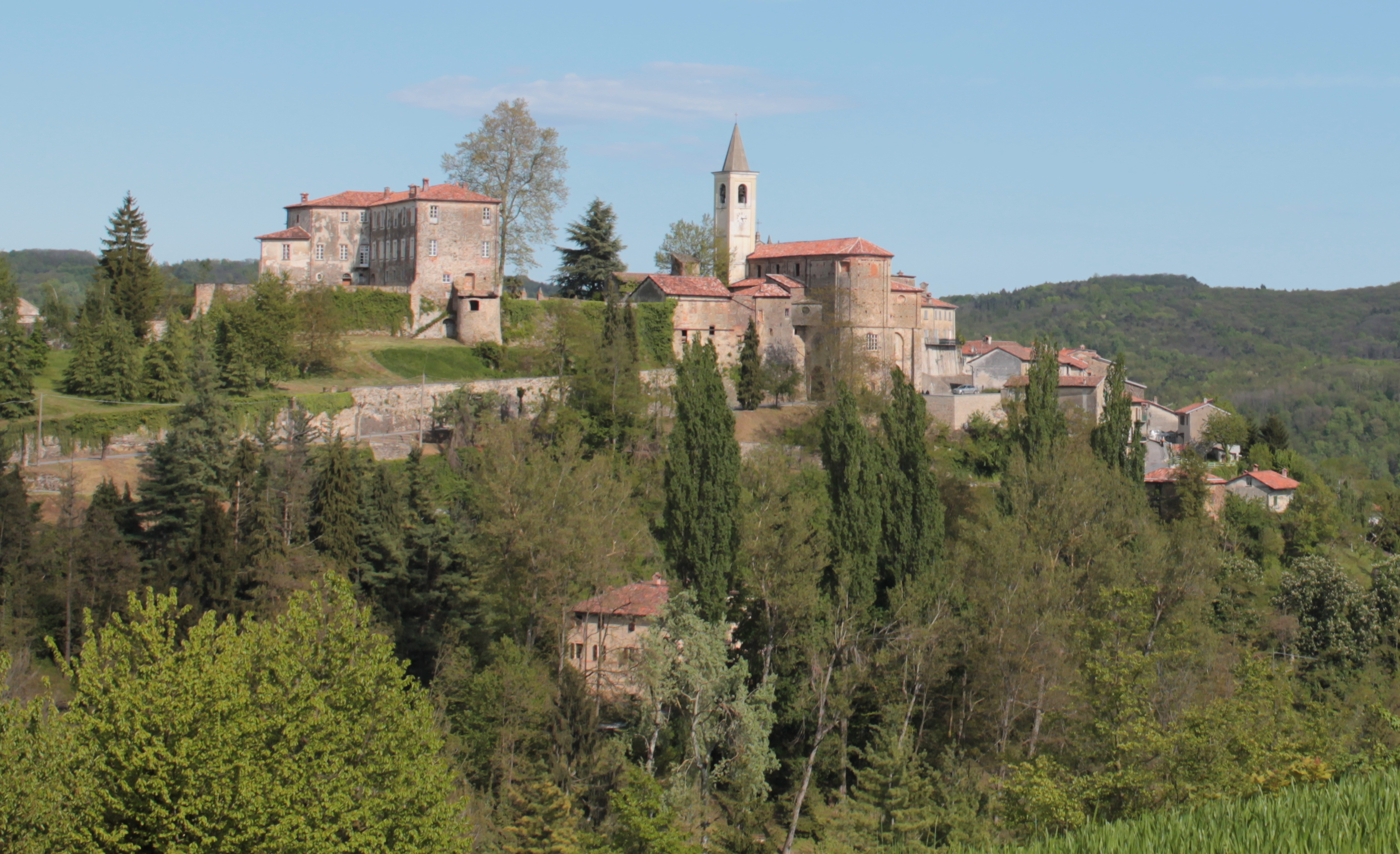

- Location within Italy Location within Piedmont
- Coordinates: 44°24′N 8°5′E
- Country: Italy
- Region: Piedmont
- Province: Province of Cuneo (CN)

Area
  - Total: 8.1 km^{2} (3.1 sq mi)
- Elevation: 615 m (2,018 ft)

Population (Dec. 2004)
  - Total: 181
  - Density: 22/km^{2} (58/sq mi)
- Demonym: Salesi
- Time zone: UTC+1 (CET)
  - Summer (DST): UTC+2 (CEST)
- Postal code: 12070
- Dialing code: 0174

Sale San Giovanni is a comune (municipality) in the Province of Cuneo in the Italian region Piedmont, located about 80 kilometres (50 mi) southeast of Turin and about 45 kilometres (28 mi) east of Cuneo. As of 31 December 2004, it had a population of 181 and an area of 8.1 square kilometres (3.1 mi^{2}).

Sale San Giovanni borders the following municipalities: Camerana, Ceva, Mombarcaro, Paroldo, and Sale delle Langhe.

== Demographic evolution ==
Historical population

| Year | Pop. | ±% |
|---|---|---|
| 1861 | 554 | — |
| 1871 | 585 | +5.6% |
| 1881 | 637 | +8.9% |
| 1901 | 625 | −1.9% |
| 1911 | 606 | −3.0% |

| Year | Pop. | ±% |
|---|---|---|
| 1921 | 538 | −11.2% |
| 1931 | 514 | −4.5% |
| 1936 | 542 | +5.4% |
| 1951 | 517 | −4.6% |
| 1961 | 410 | −20.7% |

| Year | Pop. | ±% |
|---|---|---|
| 1971 | 319 | −22.2% |
| 1981 | 250 | −21.6% |
| 1991 | 192 | −23.2% |
| 2001 | 193 | +0.5% |

Source: Data from ISTAT
