= Sale delle Langhe =

- Comune
- Comune di Sale delle Langhe
- Location within Italy Location within Piedmont
- Coordinates: 44°24′N 8°5′E
- Country: Italy
- Region: Piedmont
- Province: Province of Cuneo (CN)
- Frazioni: Arbi

Area
  - Total: 10.9 km^{2} (4.2 sq mi)
- Elevation: 480 m (1,570 ft)

Population (Dec. 2004)
  - Total: 509
  - Density: 46.7/km^{2} (121/sq mi)
- Demonym: Salesi
- Time zone: UTC+1 (CET)
  - Summer (DST): UTC+2 (CEST)
- Postal code: 12070
- Dialing code: 0174
- Website: Official website

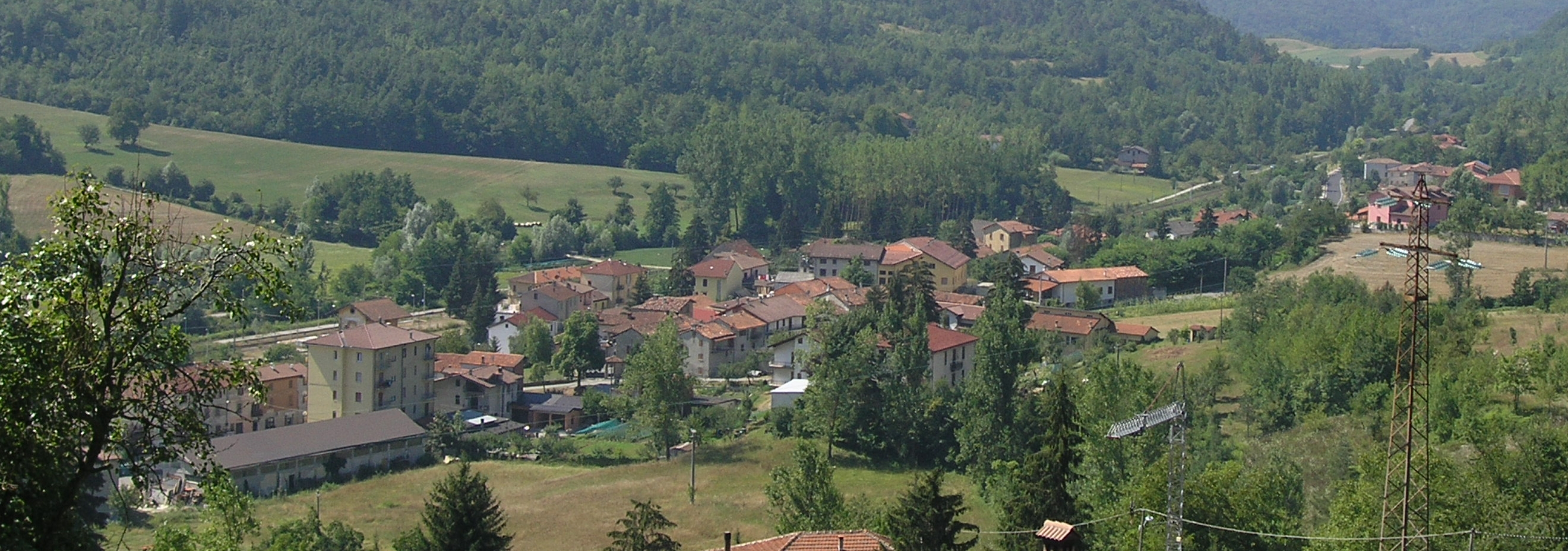
Landscape of Sale delle Langhe (Italy)

Sale delle Langhe is a comune (municipality) in the Province of Cuneo in the Italian region Piedmont, located about 80 kilometres (50 mi) southeast of Turin and about 45 kilometres (28 mi) east of Cuneo. As of 31 December 2004, it had a population of 509 and an area of 10.9 square kilometres (4.2 mi^{2}).

The municipality of Sale delle Langhe contains the frazione (subdivision) Arbi.

Sale delle Langhe borders the following municipalities: Camerana, Ceva, Montezemolo, Priero, and Sale San Giovanni.

== Demographic evolution ==
Historical population

Year	Pop.	±%
1861	692	—
1871	740	+6.9%
1881	796	+7.6%
1901	781	−1.9%
1911	882	+12.9%

Year	Pop.	±%
1921	912	+3.4%
1931	915	+0.3%
1936	933	+2.0%
1951	925	−0.9%
1961	814	−12.0%

Year	Pop.	±%
1971	630	−22.6%
1981	554	−12.1%
1991	513	−7.4%
2001	490	−4.5%

Source: Data from ISTAT
