= Gottasecca =

- Comune
- Comune di Gottasecca
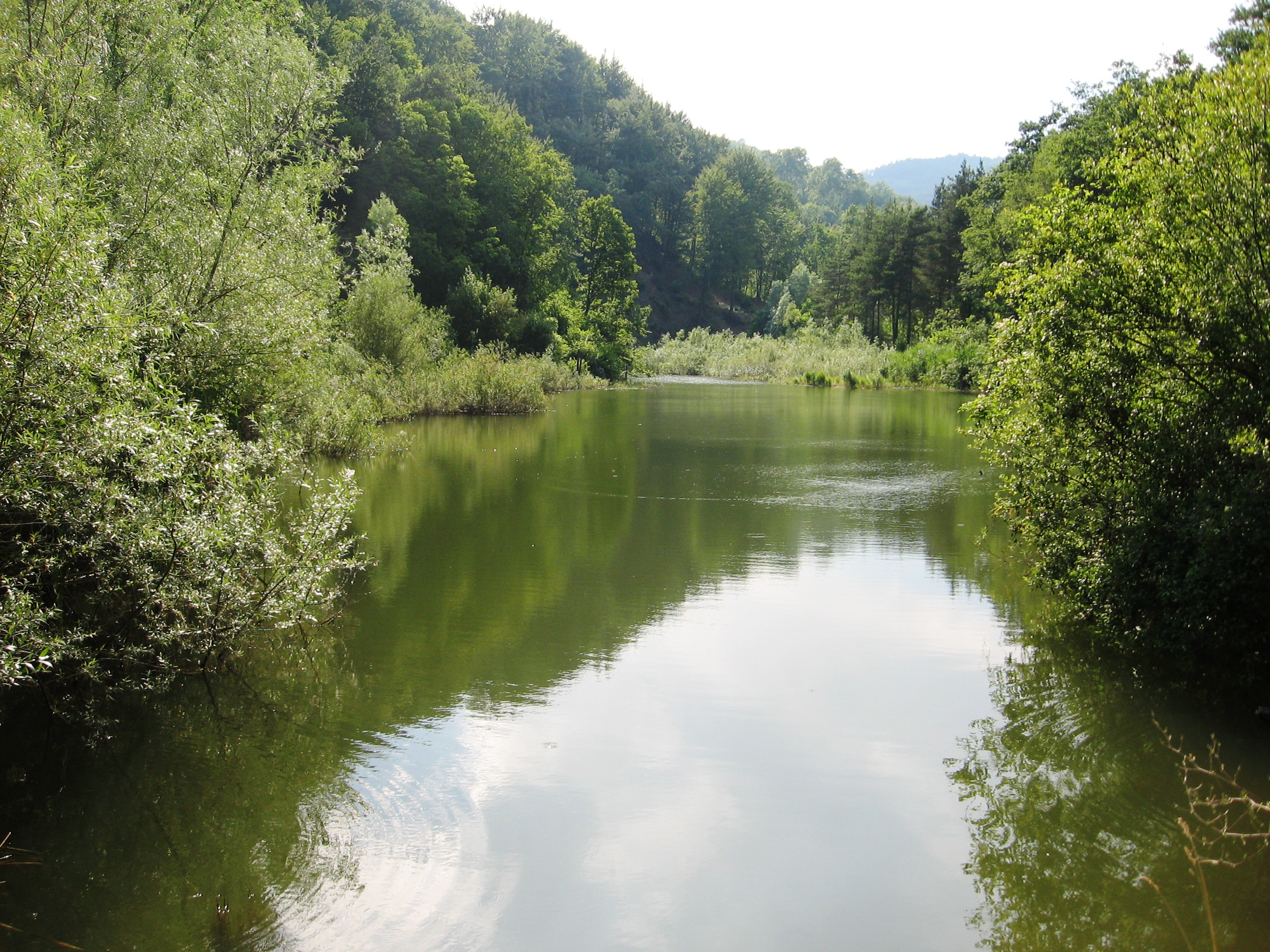
- Lago del Vaglio natural area.

- Coat of arms

- Location within Italy Location within Piedmont
- Coordinates: 44°28′N 8°10′E
- Country: Italy
- Region: Piedmont
- Province: Cuneo (CN)

Government
  - Mayor: Adriano Manfredi

Area
  - Total: 13.5 km^{2} (5.2 sq mi)
- Elevation: 710 m (2,330 ft)

Population (31 July 2010)
  - Total: 183
  - Density: 13.6/km^{2} (35.1/sq mi)
- Time zone: UTC+1 (CET)
  - Summer (DST): UTC+2 (CEST)
- Postal code: 12072
- Dialing code: 0174
- Website: Official website

Gottasecca is a comune (municipality) in the Province of Cuneo in the Italian region Piedmont, located about 80 kilometres (50 mi) southeast of Turin and about 50 kilometres (31 mi) east of Cuneo.

Gottasecca borders the following municipalities: Cairo Montenotte, Camerana, Castelletto Uzzone, Dego, Monesiglio, Prunetto, and Saliceto.
