= Cortemilia =

Cortemilia Cortmija (Piedmontese)
- Comune
- Comune di Cortemilia
- Location within Italy Location within Piedmont
- Coordinates: 44°35′N 8°12′E
- Country: Italy
- Region: Piedmont
- Province: Province of Cuneo (CN)
- Frazioni: San Michele, San Pantaleo, Castella, Pieve, Bruceto, Doglio, San Giacomo, Santa Lucia, Sulite, Salino

Government
  - Mayor: Roberto Bodrito

Area
  - Total: 24.7 km^{2} (9.5 sq mi)

Population (30 June 2017)
  - Total: 2,302
  - Density: 93.2/km^{2} (241/sq mi)
- Demonym: Cortemiliesi
- Time zone: UTC+1 (CET)
  - Summer (DST): UTC+2 (CEST)
- Postal code: 12074
- Dialing code: 0173

Cortemilia (Piedmontese: Cortmija) is a comune (municipality) in the Province of Cuneo in the Italian region Piedmont, located about 70 kilometres (43 mi) southeast of Turin and about 60 kilometres (37 mi) northeast of Cuneo.

Cortemilia borders the following municipalities: Bergolo, Bosia, Castino, Perletto, Pezzolo Valle Uzzone, Serole, and Torre Bormida.

== History ==
=== Prehistory and Roman age ===
In the area surrounding the town were found some fragments of artefacts and tools dating back to the Palaeolithic and Neolithic age, like an axe's head. This evidence confirms the possible existence of "stations" (more or less temporary settlements) in the area where nowadays Cortemilia is situated from the sixth until the second millennium BC.

The original center of Cortemilia is probably of pre-Roman origins but It bloomed during the Roman administration. The importance of Cortemilian during the Roman time is proved by some tombstones found just next the town centre.

Inside the town's coat of arm the name of the town is displayed in Latin language "Cohors Aemilia", which, according to a highly accredited hypothesis, is referring to the console Marco Emilio Scaurus. He was the creator of the track "Via Aemilia Scauri" that connected Luni Vada Sabatia (Savona) with Its hinterland.

== Gastronomy ==
Cortemilia is noted for production of one of the most famous types of hazelnut, the Tonda Gentile di Langa, awarded IGP status. Every August the town celebrates the Sagra della Nocciola (hazelnut fair).

== Demographic evolution ==
Historical population

Year	Pop.	±%
1861	3,000	—
1871	3,460	+15.3%
1881	3,350	−3.2%
1901	3,790	+13.1%
1911	3,567	−5.9%

Year	Pop.	±%
1921	3,620	+1.5%
1931	3,618	−0.1%
1936	3,576	−1.2%
1951	3,138	−12.2%
1961	2,729	−13.0%

Year	Pop.	±%
1971	2,606	−4.5%
1981	2,681	+2.9%
1991	2,587	−3.5%
2001	2,544	−1.7%

Source: Data from ISTAT
