= Pezzolo Valle Uzzone =

- Comune
- Comune di Pezzolo Valle Uzzone
- Coat of arms

- Location within Italy Location within Piedmont
- Coordinates: 44°32′N 8°12′E
- Country: Italy
- Region: Piedmont
- Province: Cuneo (CN)

Government
  - Mayor: Piero Sugliano

Area
  - Total: 27.4 km^{2} (10.6 sq mi)
- Elevation: 321 m (1,053 ft)

Population (31 July 2010)
  - Total: 354
  - Density: 12.9/km^{2} (33.5/sq mi)
- Demonym: Pezzolesi
- Time zone: UTC+1 (CET)
  - Summer (DST): UTC+2 (CEST)
- Postal code: 12070
- Dialing code: 0173

Pezzolo Valle Uzzone is a comune (municipality) in the Province of Cuneo in the Italian region Piedmont, located about 70 kilometres (43 mi) southeast of Turin and about 50 kilometres (31 mi) northeast of Cuneo.

Pezzolo Valle Uzzone borders the following municipalities: Bergolo, Castelletto Uzzone, Cortemilia, Levice, Piana Crixia, and Serole.
