= Murazzano =

Murazzano Murassan (Piedmontese)
- Comune
- Comune di Murazzano
- Coat of arms

- Location within Italy Location within Piedmont
- Coordinates: 44°28′N 8°1′E
- Country: Italy
- Region: Piedmont
- Province: Cuneo (CN)
- Frazioni: Cornati, Mellea, Rea

Government
  - Mayor: Vito Nono Gianni Galli

Area
  - Total: 27.7 km^{2} (10.7 sq mi)
- Elevation: 749 m (2,457 ft)

Population (31 May 2007)
  - Total: 845
  - Density: 30.5/km^{2} (79.0/sq mi)
- Demonym: Murazzanesi
- Time zone: UTC+1 (CET)
  - Summer (DST): UTC+2 (CEST)
- Postal code: 12060
- Dialing code: 0173
- Website: Official website

Murazzano (Italian pronunciation: [muratˈtsaːno]; Piedmontese: Murassan [myraˈsɑŋ]) is a comune (municipality) in the province of Cuneo, in the Italian region of Piedmont, located about 70 kilometres (43 mi) southeast of Turin and about 40 kilometres (25 mi) east of Cuneo.

Murazzano borders the following municipalities: Belvedere Langhe, Bonvicino, Bossolasco, Clavesana, Igliano, Marsaglia, Mombarcaro, Paroldo, San Benedetto Belbo, and Torresina. It is a center of robiola cheese production.
