= Frabosa =

Frabosa may refer to:

- Frabosa Soprana, municipality in the province of Cuneo in the Italian region Piedmont
- Frabosa Sottana, municipality in the province of Cuneo in the Italian region Piedmont
