= San Michele Mondovì =

- Comune
- Comune di San Michele Mondovì
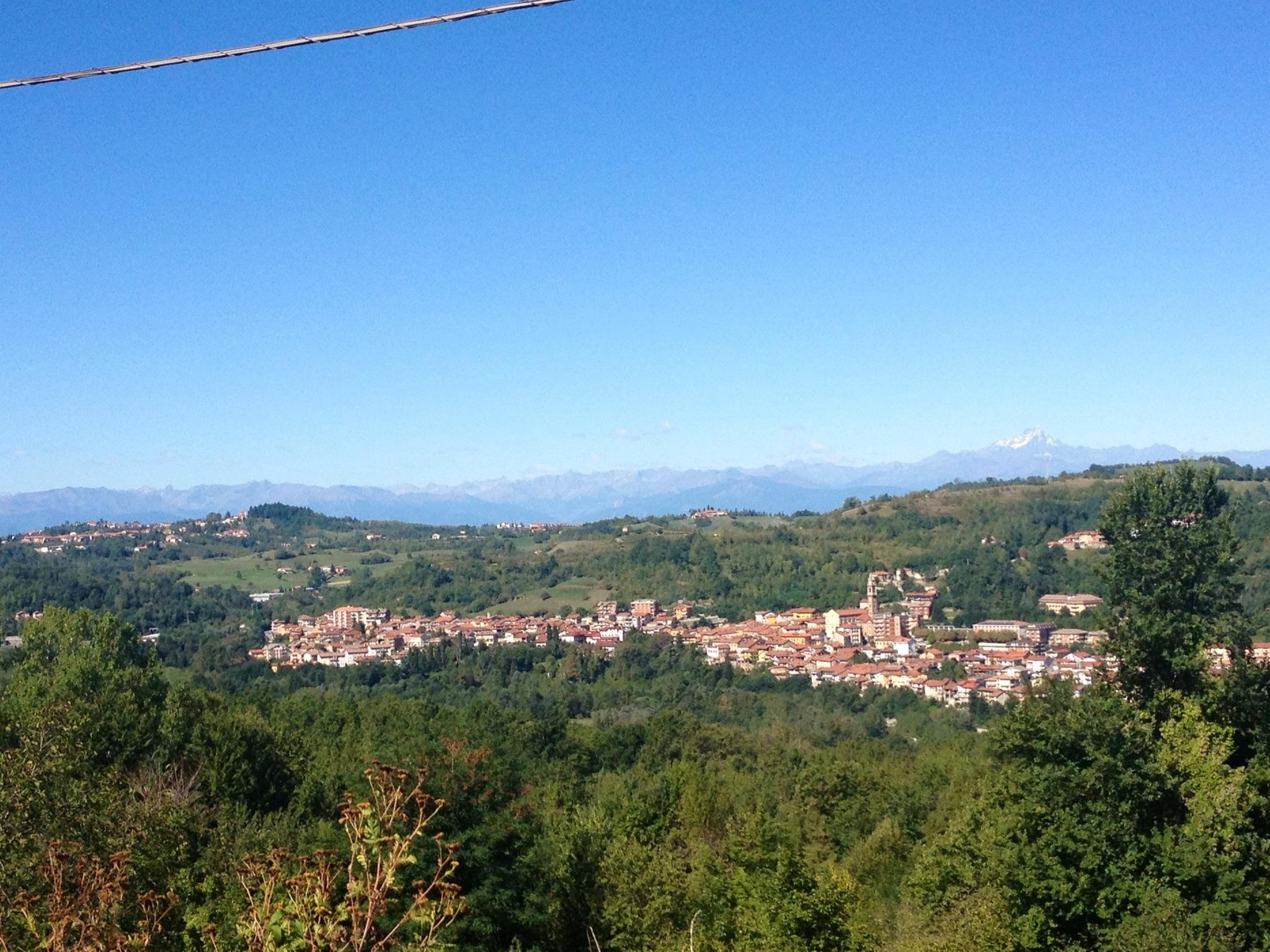
- Landscape of San Michele Mondovì (Italy)

- Location within Italy Location within Piedmont
- Coordinates: 44°23′N 7°54′E
- Country: Italy
- Region: Piedmont
- Province: Province of Cuneo (CN)

Area
  - Total: 18.2 km^{2} (7.0 sq mi)

Population (Dec. 2019)
  - Total: 1,891
  - Density: 104/km^{2} (269/sq mi)
- Time zone: UTC+1 (CET)
  - Summer (DST): UTC+2 (CEST)
- Postal code: 12080
- Dialing code: 0174

San Michele Mondovì is a comune (municipality) in the Province of Cuneo in the Italian region Piedmont, located about 80 kilometres (50 mi) south of Turin and about 30 kilometres (19 mi) east of Cuneo. As of 31 December 2004, it had a population of 2,064 and an area of 18.2 square kilometres (7.0 mi^{2}).

San Michele Mondovì borders the following municipalities: Lesegno, Mombasiglio, Monasterolo Casotto, Niella Tanaro, Torre Mondovì, and Vicoforte.

== History ==
The first written sources that speak of San Michele date back to 1113. The source records a donation from a rich gentleman to the church of the small village of San Michele.

The first inhabitants of these places were probably the Ligurians and the Romans of whom evidence can still be found in the territories of Mombasiglio, Vico and Torre.

Given their geographical layout, it is easy to assume that the roads that connected these villages crossed the point where San Michele Mondovì now stands.

We can therefore reasonably assume that the first houses, the original nucleus of our town, arose precisely in this place.

The very name of San Michele seems to owe its derivation to the Lombards, due to the devotion that these people had for the archangel Michael.

During this Lombard lordship, between the sixth and ninth centuries, three classes of farmers lived in the area. The first class included the free cultivators, linked to the lords only by a contract, the last included the dependent cultivators, bound to the master as serfs with the land they cultivated. Between these two classes there existed a third intermediate one, the farmers or settlers, whose obligations were determined by local customs and the condition of the land they cultivated. This class was very large.

The documents found, especially the statutes, seem to mention these three classes also in the village of San Michele.

The Church of San Michele depended on the Bishops of Asti who had, in addition to spiritual power, also civil power with the title of Counts over the Bredolo countryside.

Towards the end of the 20th century the Lords of those places and of other towns in Piedmont and Provence had managed to repel the invasion of the Saracens and help the population to recover. Around their castles and the churches and convents built with their support, villages grew and agriculture and industries developed.

A leveling process was then imposed on the workers of the lands which led them to a better condition with the possession of the lands as their own by paying only a tribute (or census) to the Lord.

Even the lower class benefited from this movement: the Lord of the lands, to lighten the burden of supporting his rustic servants, assigned part of his own farms to them so that they could enjoy them freely. Since the beginning of 1100 these farmers had also become census takers with the obligation of a tribute or census which was however very burdensome.

In the following century the Bishops of Asti found themselves faced with two new forces, that of the small Lords or Vassals and that of the populations themselves eager for improvements.

From these comparisons, officially registered conventions and agreements were born and some of these concerned San Michele itself.

The oldest document that tells us about the village of San Michele dates back to 1113 and records a donation made to the church of this place by some noble families from the Bredolo countryside, to which San Michele also belonged.

A few years later, the improvement of the conditions of the farmers of the land was further favored by the dispute between the Italian municipalities against the German emperors, which was also strongly felt in our territory.

It was part of the Marquisate of Ceva, whose family built the Castle, which today is almost completely ruined.

This movement led both the feudal lords and the Bishop of Asti to grant greater freedom to the populations to maintain their friendship and loyalty.

Later, many of them, desiring an even more free and independent life, broke away from the Bishop of Asti and took refuge on Monte di Vico.

Thus they founded the new community of Monteregale which had its own government.

«Glory to your fortresses, oh bridge of San Michele!»

(Giosue Carducci)

It is also worth remembering the historic Napoleonic battle which took place on 19 April 1796 on the banks of the Corsaglia and throughout the country between the Austro-Piedmontese and Napoleonic troops. Memories and sources of that battle still remain today, both written, the praise of Giosuè Carducci Bicocca di San Giacomo (in the collection Rhymes and rhythms), and material, such as the bridge that now connects the sports facilities to the town (near the Chapel of Saint Lucia).

== Civil Architecture ==
=== Castle ===
Now only the ruins of the ancient castle remain, which however recall the majesty of the building, which overlooked the entire town from the hill.

=== King's Palace ===
Also worthy of historical appreciation is the "King's Palace" where once the Savoys and particularly Vittorio Emanuele II came to stay, change their horses with rested horses and set off again in the direction of the Royal Palace of Valcasotto.

=== Piazza Umberto I ===
Piazza Umberto I, the main square of the town The main square of the town is Piazza Umberto I. It was built in the fascist era, in fact you can see the large space, the terrace and the typical architecture of that historical period.

== Religious architecture ==
=== Church of San Michele Arcangelo ===
The parish church of San Michele is dedicated to Saint Michael the Archangel, the patron saint of the town which bears his name. a church was built in 1710, to replace the old church; in 1900, however, the new bell tower and the new presbytery were built.

==== Structure ====
The church, probably the work of the Monregalese architect Francesco Gallo, is in Neoclassical style.

==== Churchyard ====
The churchyard can be reached via a staircase in front of the church or from the right and left side where it is at street level.

The churchyard has a stone pavement.

==== Entrance ====
Once you go up to the churchyard, you can enter the church through the entrance door. The entrance is separated from the interior by a wooden compass.

Usually entry is permitted through the side doors, while on special occasions, the central door is also opened.

==== Internal ====
The church is made up of three naves, two lateral and one central. It has two rows of desks.

Near the side naves there are four altars, two on the right and two on the left, two confessionals, two statues and, in the right nave, the wooden pulpit, richly and finely inlaid.

At the end of the naves there is the Presbytery, with the main altar in marble and the Ambo, also in marble.

The Tabernacle of the Blessed Sacrament is located behind the altar.

==== Paintings ====
Each side altar features several paintings.

The Triptych painted by the three San Michele artists Pecchenino, Cozza and Roà is important. It represents Saint Justina, Saint Michael the Archangel and, in the centre, the Holy Family.

=== St. Paul's Church ===
Also important is the church of San Paolo, one of the largest hamlets of San Michele. They are very similar in structure to the church of San Michele.

=== Chapels and pylons ===
Throughout the municipal area there are numerous chapels and votive pillars dating back to the 14th century onwards. However, the chapel of San Giovanni is believed to be much older.

There are eleven chapels in all: the chapels of San Giovanni, Santa Lucia, the Madonna delle Nevi, Sant'Antonio e Magno, del Buon Gesù, San Gervasio and Protasio, San Bernardino, San Sebastiano, Madonna di Guarene, San Bernardo (now ruined) and San Giacomo alla Bicocca.

In each chapel paintings emerge, most of which have recently undergone conservative restoration.

== Climate ==
The climate of San Michele is typical of the Maritime Alps area, characterized by cold winters (the average temperature of the coldest month, January, stands at +2.9 °C) and hot summers due to the influence of the nearby Sea Ligurian (the temperature of the hottest month, July, is +22.1 °C). Winters are quite snowy.

The average annual rainfall is around 800 mm, distributed on average over 68 days, with minimums in winter and summer and maximum peaks in spring and autumn.

The table below shows the monthly, seasonal and annual absolute maximum and minimum temperatures from 1951 to today, with the relative year in which these were recorded. The absolute maximum of the period examined of +37.4 °C was in August 2003, while the absolute minimum of −24 °C was in February 2012.

== Sports ==
San Michele has some sports facilities, the tennis pitch, the football pitch, the 5-a-side football pitch, a beach volleyball court and two courts for playing bowls.

== Infrastructure and transport ==
=== Roads ===
The town is bordered by the Colle di Nava state road 28.

Inside, the main road is via Angelo Nielli, which runs through the town from the beginning (when the state road splits, forming via Nielli) to the end, when the road rejoins the state road. Shortly before the end of the town, via Nielli intersects with via Rocchini, the provincial road that leads to Niella Tanaro.

=== Railways ===
San Michele is served by the Vicoforte-San Michele stop, a former station located along the Turin-Savona railway served by regional trains operated by Trenitalia as part of the service contract stipulated with the Piedmont Region.

Until 1953 the connection with the station was carried out via the Mondovì-San Michele electric tramway.

=== Airports ===
The closest airport to San Michele is Levaldigi.

== Mayors from the post-war period to today ==
1946	1956	Ermete Marenco
1956	1960	Giuseppe Botto
1960	1975	Giuseppe Sordo
1975	1985	Constantino Plazzi
1985	2004	Donato Baravalle
2004	2013	Fulvio Ruffa
2013	2023	Domenico Michelotti
2023		Daniele Aimone

== Demographic evolution ==
Historical population

Year	Pop.	±%
1861	2,041	—
1871	2,011	−1.5%
1881	2,057	+2.3%
1901	2,008	−2.4%
1911	2,013	+0.2%

Year	Pop.	±%
1921	1,901	−5.6%
1931	1,992	+4.8%
1936	1,936	−2.8%
1951	1,816	−6.2%
1961	1,679	−7.5%

Year	Pop.	±%
1971	1,957	+16.6%
1981	2,079	+6.2%
1991	2,168	+4.3%
2001	2,069	−4.6%

Source: Data from ISTAT
