= Monasterolo Casotto =

- Comune
- Comune di Monasterolo Casotto
- Location within Italy Location within Piedmont
- Coordinates: 44°20′N 7°56′E
- Country: Italy
- Region: Piedmont
- Province: Cuneo (CN)

Government
  - Mayor: Luca Bertone

Area
  - Total: 7.7 km^{2} (3.0 sq mi)
- Elevation: 824 m (2,703 ft)

Population (31 October 2017)
  - Total: 82
  - Density: 11/km^{2} (28/sq mi)
- Demonym: Monasterolesi
- Time zone: UTC+1 (CET)
  - Summer (DST): UTC+2 (CEST)
- Postal code: 12080
- Dialing code: 0174
- Website: Official website

Monasterolo Casotto is a comune (municipality) in the Province of Cuneo in the Italian region Piedmont, located about 80 kilometres (50 mi) south of Turin and about 30 kilometres (19 mi) east of Cuneo.

Monasterolo Casotto borders the following municipalities: Lisio, Mombasiglio, Pamparato, San Michele Mondovì, Scagnello, Torre Mondovì, and Viola.

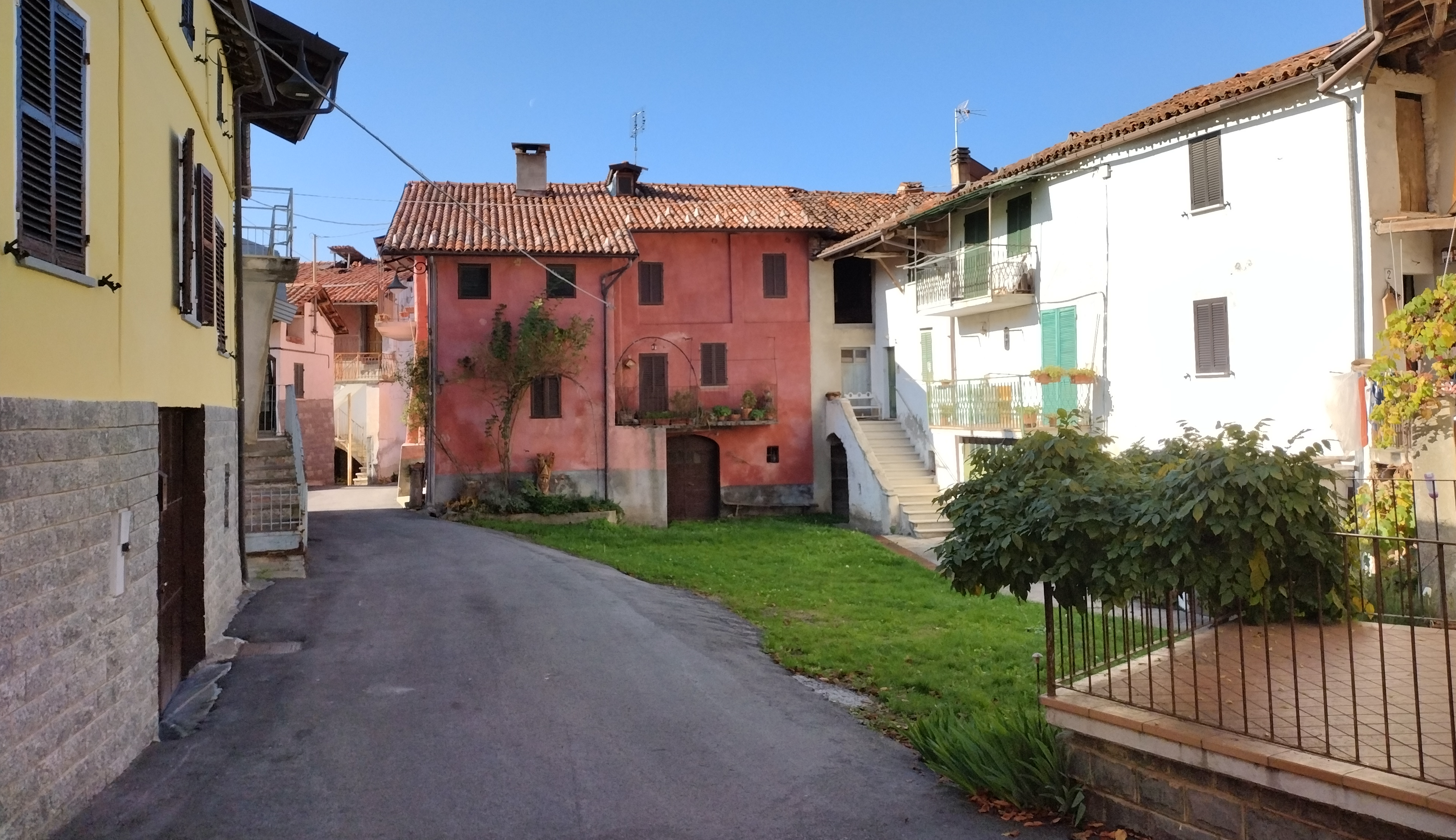
