= Torre Mondovì =

- Comune
- Comune di Torre Mondovì
- Location within Italy Location within Piedmont
- Coordinates: 44°21′N 7°54′E
- Country: Italy
- Region: Piedmont
- Province: Province of Cuneo (CN)

Area
  - Total: 18.5 km^{2} (7.1 sq mi)
- Elevation: 460 m (1,510 ft)

Population (Dec. 2004)
  - Total: 521
  - Density: 28.2/km^{2} (72.9/sq mi)
- Demonym: Torresi
- Time zone: UTC+1 (CET)
  - Summer (DST): UTC+2 (CEST)
- Postal code: 12080
- Dialing code: 0174

Torre Mondovì is a comune (municipality) in the Province of Cuneo in the Italian region Piedmont, located about 80 kilometres (50 mi) south of Turin and about 30 kilometres (19 mi) east of Cuneo. As of 31 December 2004, it had a population of 521 and an area of 18.5 square kilometres (7.1 mi^{2}).

Torre Mondovì borders the following municipalities: Monasterolo Casotto, Montaldo di Mondovì, Pamparato, Roburent, San Michele Mondovì, and Vicoforte.
