= Montaldo di Mondovì =

- Comune
- Comune di Montaldo di Mondovì
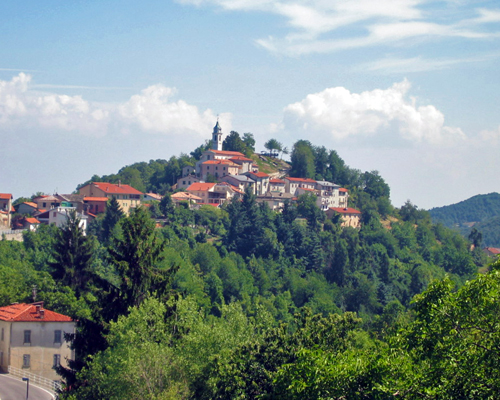

- Location within Italy Location within Piedmont
- Coordinates: 44°19′N 7°52′E
- Country: Italy
- Region: Piedmont
- Province: Cuneo (CN)

Government
  - Mayor: Giovanni Balbo

Area
  - Total: 23.58 km^{2} (9.10 sq mi)
- Elevation: 796 m (2,612 ft)

Population (30 November 2017)
  - Total: 587
  - Density: 24.9/km^{2} (64.5/sq mi)
- Demonym: Montaldesi
- Time zone: UTC+1 (CET)
  - Summer (DST): UTC+2 (CEST)
- Postal code: 12080
- Dialing code: 0174
- Website: Official website

Montaldo di Mondovì is a comune (municipality) in the Province of Cuneo in the Italian region Piedmont, located about 80 kilometres (50 mi) south of Turin and about 25 kilometres (16 mi) southeast of Cuneo.

Montaldo di Mondovì borders the following municipalities: Frabosa Soprana, Monastero di Vasco, Roburent, Torre Mondovì, and Vicoforte.
