= Bonvicino =

- Comune
- Comune di Bonvicino
- Coat of arms

- Location within Italy Location within Piedmont
- Coordinates: 44°30′N 8°1′E
- Country: Italy
- Region: Piedmont
- Province: Province of Cuneo (CN)

Area
  - Total: 7.2 km^{2} (2.8 sq mi)

Population (Dec. 2004)
  - Total: 122
  - Density: 17/km^{2} (44/sq mi)
- Time zone: UTC+1 (CET)
  - Summer (DST): UTC+2 (CEST)
- Postal code: 12060
- Dialing code: 0173

Bonvicino is a comune (municipality) in the Province of Cuneo in the Italian region Piedmont, located about 70 kilometres (43 mi) southeast of Turin and about 40 kilometres (25 mi) northeast of Cuneo. On 31 December 2004, it had a population of 122 and an area of 7.2 square kilometres (2.8 mi^{2}).

Bonvicino borders the following municipalities: Belvedere Langhe, Bossolasco, Dogliani, Murazzano and Somano.

== Demographic evolution ==
Historical population

Year	Pop.	±%
1861	653	—
1871	619	−5.2%
1881	669	+8.1%
1901	670	+0.1%
1911	586	−12.5%

Year	Pop.	±%
1921	586	+0.0%
1931	567	−3.2%
1936	542	−4.4%
1951	455	−16.1%
1961	293	−35.6%

Year	Pop.	±%
1971	211	−28.0%
1981	163	−22.7%
1991	127	−22.1%
2001	119	−6.3%

Source: Data from ISTAT
