= Monastero di Vasco =

- Comune
- Comune di Monastero di Vasco
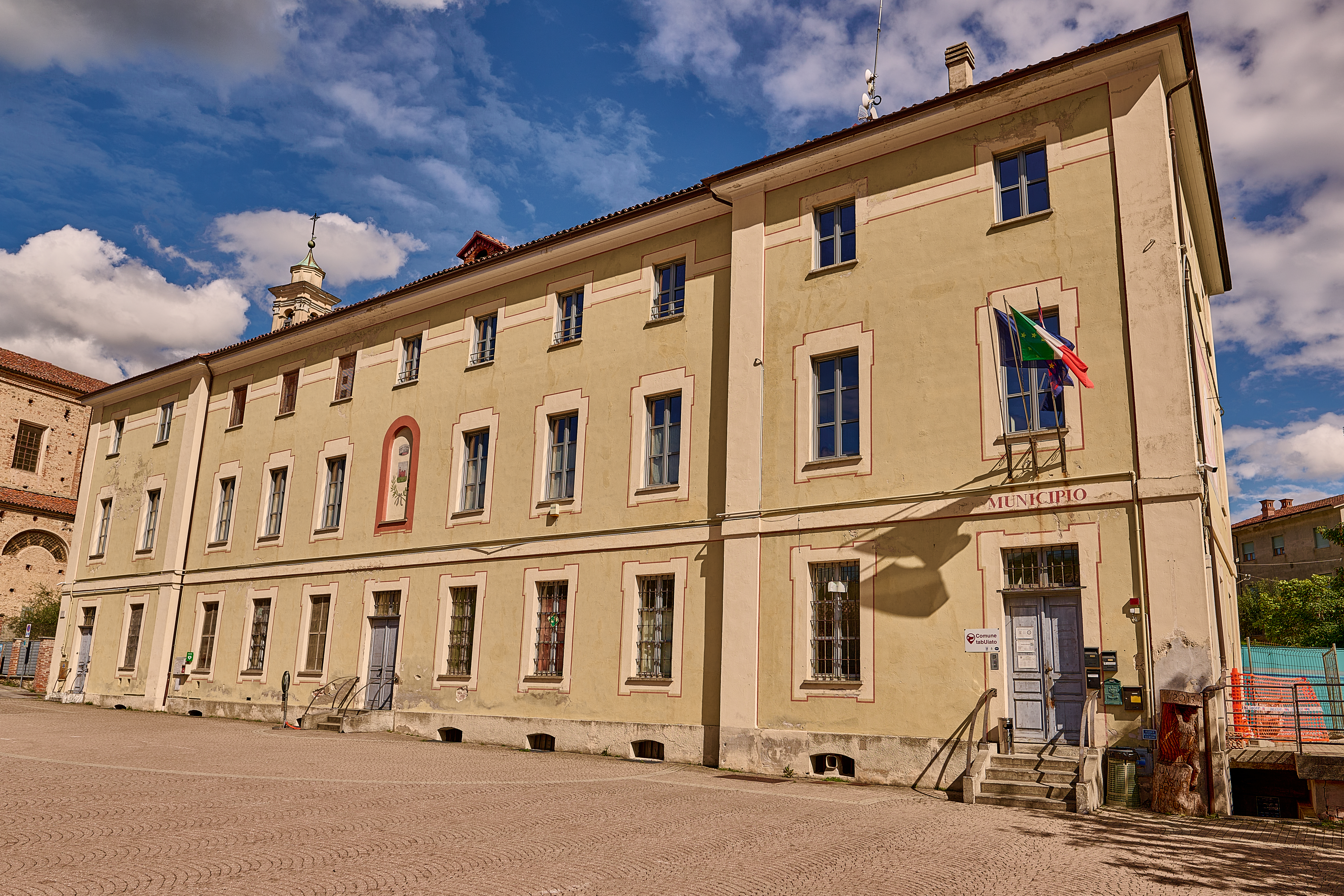

- Location within Italy Location within Piedmont
- Coordinates: 44°20′N 7°49′E
- Country: Italy
- Region: Piedmont
- Province: Cuneo (CN)
- Frazioni: Roapiana; Vasco; Malborgo; Bertolini Soprani, Bertolini Sottani

Government
  - Mayor: Giuseppe Zarcone

Area
  - Total: 17.44 km^{2} (6.73 sq mi)
- Elevation: 508 m (1,667 ft)

Population (31 December 2010)
  - Total: 1,307
  - Density: 74.94/km^{2} (194.1/sq mi)
- Demonym: Monasteresi
- Time zone: UTC+1 (CET)
  - Summer (DST): UTC+2 (CEST)
- Postal code: 12080
- Dialing code: 0174
- Website: Official website

Monastero di Vasco is a comune (municipality) in the Province of Cuneo in the Italian region Piedmont, located about 80 kilometres (50 mi) south of Turin and about 20 kilometres (12 mi) east of Cuneo.

Monastero di Vasco borders the following municipalities: Frabosa Soprana, Frabosa Sottana, Mondovì, Montaldo di Mondovì, Vicoforte, and Villanova Mondovì.
