= Niella Tanaro =

- Comune
- Comune di Niella Tanaro
- Location within Italy Location within Piedmont
- Coordinates: 44°25′N 7°55′E
- Country: Italy
- Region: Piedmont
- Province: Cuneo (CN)

Government
  - Mayor: Lola Pensa

Area
  - Total: 15.71 km^{2} (6.07 sq mi)
- Elevation: 371 m (1,217 ft)

Population (30 November 2017)
  - Total: 1,048
  - Density: 66.71/km^{2} (172.8/sq mi)
- Demonym: Niellesi
- Time zone: UTC+1 (CET)
  - Summer (DST): UTC+2 (CEST)
- Postal code: 12060
- Dialing code: 0174
- Website: Official website

Niella Tanaro is a comune (municipality) in the Province of Cuneo in the Italian region Piedmont, located about 70 kilometres (43 mi) south of Turin and about 30 kilometres (19 mi) east of Cuneo.

Niella Tanaro borders the following municipalities: Briaglia, Castellino Tanaro, Cigliè, Lesegno, Mondovì, Rocca Cigliè, San Michele Mondovì, and Vicoforte.
