= Scagnello =

- Comune
- Comune di Scagnello
- Location within Italy Location within Piedmont
- Coordinates: 44°20′N 7°59′E
- Country: Italy
- Region: Piedmont
- Province: Province of Cuneo (CN)

Government
  - Mayor: Ivo Borgna

Area
  - Total: 9.0 km^{2} (3.5 sq mi)

Population (Dec. 2004)
  - Total: 209
  - Density: 23/km^{2} (60/sq mi)
- Time zone: UTC+1 (CET)
  - Summer (DST): UTC+2 (CEST)
- Postal code: 12070
- Dialing code: 0174

Scagnello is a comune (municipality) in the Province of Cuneo in the Italian region Piedmont, located about 80 kilometres (50 mi) southeast of Turin and about 35 kilometres (22 mi) east of Cuneo. As of 31 December 2004, it had a population of 209 and an area of 9.0 square kilometres (3.5 mi^{2}).

Scagnello borders the following municipalities: Battifollo, Ceva, Lisio, Mombasiglio, and Monasterolo Casotto. It belongs to the villages of Val Mongia.

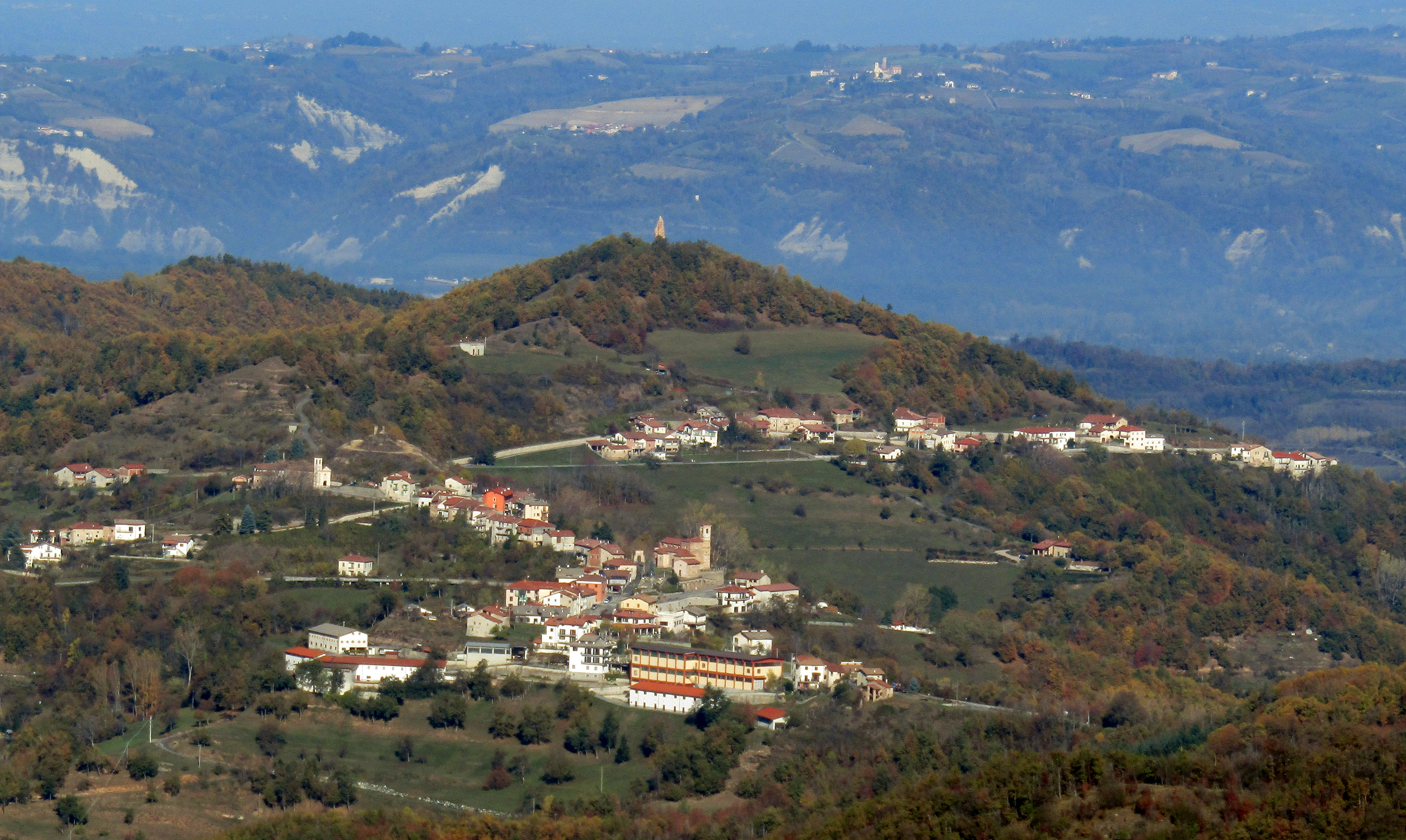
Scagnello as seen from Bric Ciarandella

Scagnello means "Customs". Scagnello was a cornerstone on the Old Salt Route from Genoa to Milan. Most of its richness was destroyed during the Napoleonic phase of occupation and destruction. Only old ruins of castles document the prior power. Currently an old house still exists which has a catalogued fresco from the 15th century.

== Demographic evolution ==
Historical population

Year	Pop.	±%
1861	538	—
1871	566	+5.2%
1881	584	+3.2%
1901	542	−7.2%
1911	572	+5.5%

Year	Pop.	±%
1921	605	+5.8%
1931	532	−12.1%
1936	521	−2.1%
1951	449	−13.8%
1961	323	−28.1%

Year	Pop.	±%
1971	227	−29.7%
1981	214	−5.7%
1991	220	+2.8%
2001	209	−5.0%

Source: Data from ISTAT
