= Rocca Cigliè =

- Comune
- Comune di Rocca Cigliè
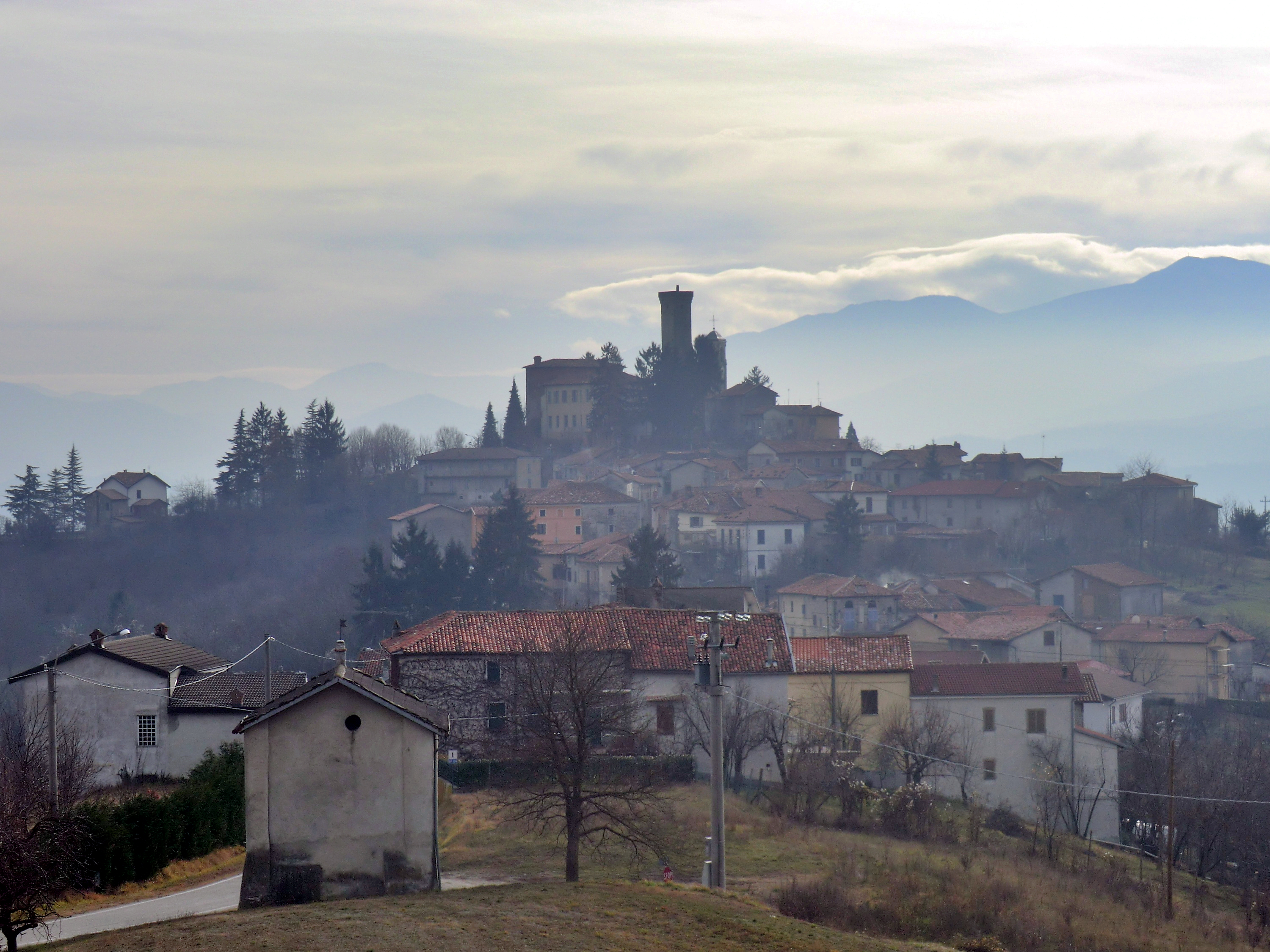
- View of Rocca Cigliè

- Location within Italy Location within Piedmont
- Coordinates: 44°27′N 7°57′E
- Country: Italy
- Region: Piedmont
- Province: Province of Cuneo (CN)

Area
  - Total: 7.3 km^{2} (2.8 sq mi)

Population (Dec. 2004)
  - Total: 149
  - Density: 20/km^{2} (53/sq mi)
- Time zone: UTC+1 (CET)
  - Summer (DST): UTC+2 (CEST)
- Postal code: 12060
- Dialing code: 0174

Rocca Cigliè is a comune (municipality) in the Province of Cuneo in the Italian region Piedmont, located about 70 kilometres (43 mi) southeast of Turin and about 35 kilometres (22 mi) east of Cuneo. As of 31 December 2004, it had a population of 149 and an area of 7.3 square kilometres (2.8 mi^{2}).

Rocca Cigliè borders the following municipalities: Castellino Tanaro, Cigliè, Clavesana, Marsaglia, and Niella Tanaro.

== Demographic evolution ==
Historical population

Year	Pop.	±%
1861	585	—
1871	632	+8.0%
1881	658	+4.1%
1901	635	−3.5%
1911	670	+5.5%

Year	Pop.	±%
1921	715	+6.7%
1931	668	−6.6%
1936	651	−2.5%
1951	460	−29.3%
1961	340	−26.1%

Year	Pop.	±%
1971	336	−1.2%
1981	262	−22.0%
1991	218	−16.8%
2001	157	−28.0%

Source: Data from ISTAT
