= Briaglia =

- Comune
- Comune di Briaglia
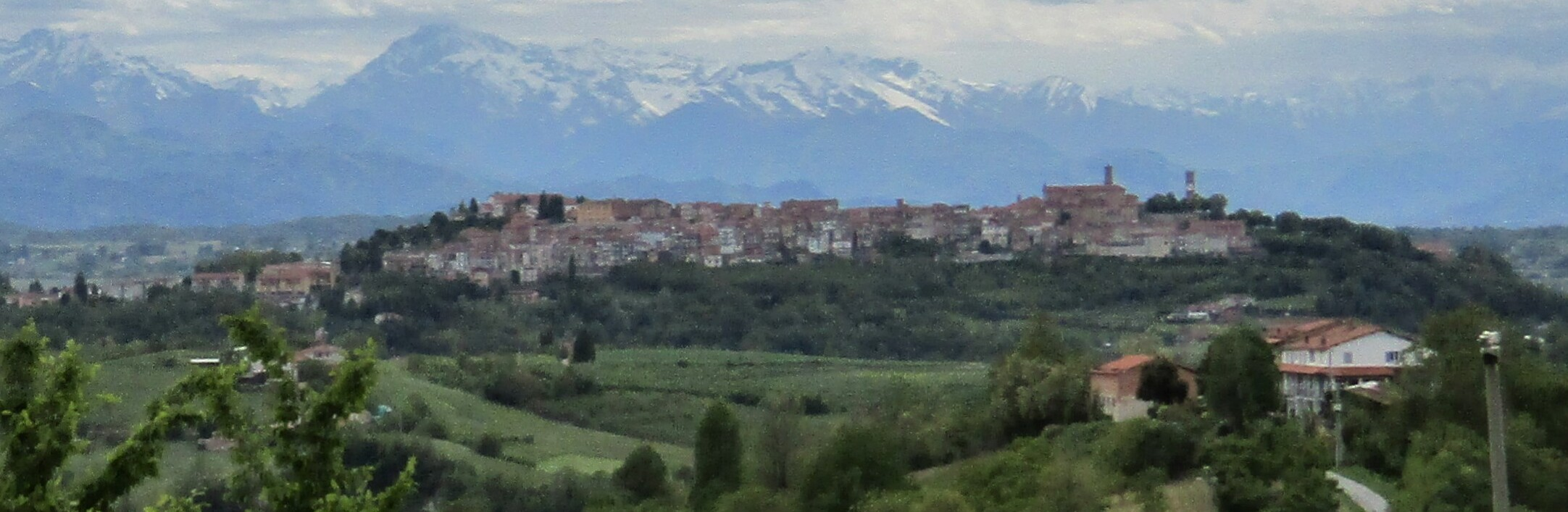

- Coat of arms

- Location within Italy Location within Piedmont
- Coordinates: 44°24′N 7°53′E
- Country: Italy
- Region: Piedmont
- Province: Province of Cuneo (CN)

Area
  - Total: 6.2 km^{2} (2.4 sq mi)

Population (Dec. 2004)
  - Total: 314
  - Density: 51/km^{2} (130/sq mi)
- Time zone: UTC+1 (CET)
  - Summer (DST): UTC+2 (CEST)
- Postal code: 12080
- Dialing code: 0174

Briaglia is a comune (municipality) in the Province of Cuneo in the Italian region Piedmont, located about 80 kilometres (50 mi) south of Turin and about 25 kilometres (16 mi) east of Cuneo. As of 31 December 2004, it had a population of 314 and an area of 6.2 square kilometres (2.4 mi^{2}).

Briaglia borders the following municipalities: Mondovì, Niella Tanaro, and Vicoforte.

== Demographic evolution ==
Historical population

Year	Pop.	±%
1861	581	—
1871	594	+2.2%
1881	629	+5.9%
1901	642	+2.1%
1911	712	+10.9%

Year	Pop.	±%
1921	673	−5.5%
1931	643	−4.5%
1936	565	−12.1%
1951	491	−13.1%
1961	397	−19.1%

Year	Pop.	±%
1971	368	−7.3%
1981	279	−24.2%
1991	263	−5.7%
2001	288	+9.5%

Source: Data from ISTAT
