= Clavesana =

- Comune
- Comune di Clavesana
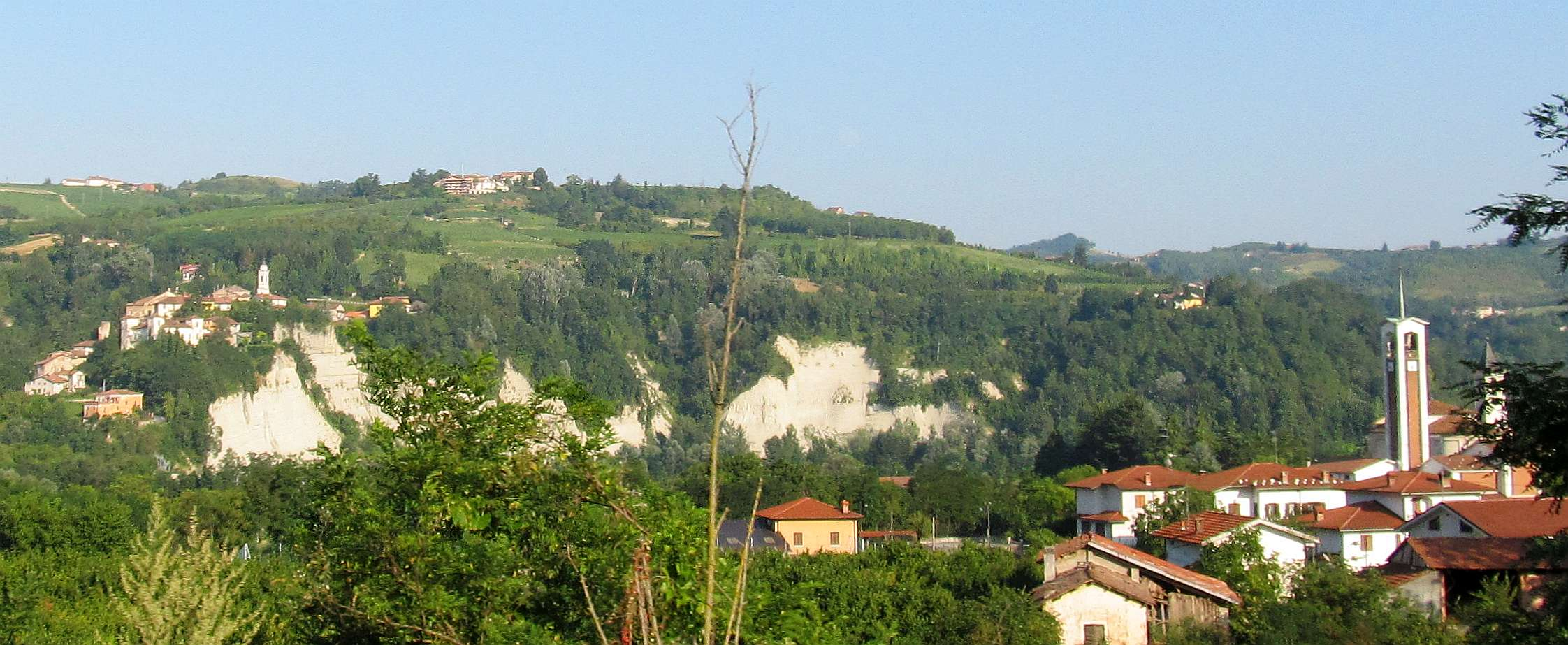

- Location within Italy Location within Piedmont
- Coordinates: 44°29′N 7°54′E
- Country: Italy
- Region: Piedmont
- Province: Province of Cuneo (CN)
- Frazioni: Madonna delle Neve, Ghigliani, Sbaranzo, Surie, Costa Prà, Feia, Prato del Pozzo, Cravili, Ansaldi, Villero, Gorea, Chiecchi, San Pietro, San Bartolomeo, Gai, Gerino, Tetti

Area
  - Total: 17.15 km^{2} (6.62 sq mi)
- Elevation: 300 m (980 ft)

Population (Dec. 2004)
  - Total: 845
  - Density: 49.3/km^{2} (128/sq mi)
- Demonym: Clavesanesi
- Time zone: UTC+1 (CET)
  - Summer (DST): UTC+2 (CEST)
- Postal code: 12060
- Dialing code: 0173
- Patron saint: Madonna della Neve
- Saint day: 5 August
- Website: Official website

Clavesana is a comune (municipality) in the Province of Cuneo in the Italian region Piedmont, located about 70 kilometres (43 mi) south of Turin and about 30 kilometres (19 mi) northeast of Cuneo. As of 31 December 2004, it had a population of 845 and an area of 17.2 square kilometres (6.6 mi^{2}).

The municipality of Clavesana contains the frazioni (subdivisions, mainly villages and hamlets) Madonna delle Neve (location of the town hall), Ghigliani, Sbaranzo, Surie, Costa Prà, Feia, Prato del Pozzo, Cravili, Ansaldi, Villero, Gorea, Chiecchi, San Pietro, San Bartolomeo, Gai, Gerino, and Tetti.

Clavesana borders the following municipalities: Bastia Mondovì, Belvedere Langhe, Carrù, Cigliè, Farigliano, Marsaglia, Murazzano, and Rocca Cigliè.

== Demographic evolution ==
Historical population

Year	Pop.	±%
1861	1,524	—
1871	1,591	+4.4%
1881	1,633	+2.6%
1901	2,100	+28.6%
1911	2,223	+5.9%

Year	Pop.	±%
1921	2,217	−0.3%
1931	2,009	−9.4%
1936	2,006	−0.1%
1951	1,859	−7.3%
1961	1,633	−12.2%

Year	Pop.	±%
1971	1,349	−17.4%
1981	1,118	−17.1%
1991	941	−15.8%
2001	868	−7.8%

Source: Data from ISTAT

== Twin towns ==
Clavesana is twinned with:

- Rogno, Italy
