= Castellino Tanaro =

Castellino Tanaro Castlin Tane
- Comune
- Comune di Castellino Tanaro
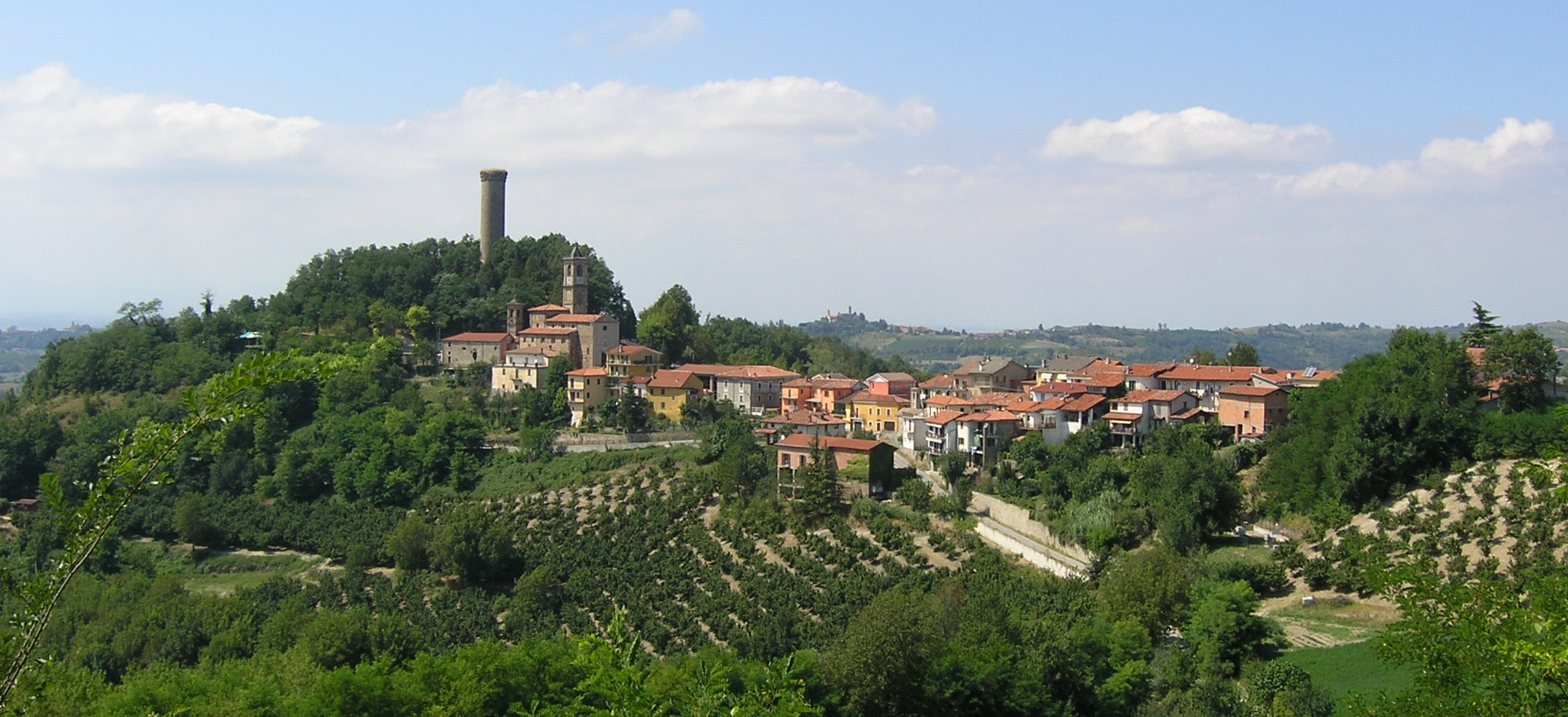

- Coat of arms

- Location within Italy Location within Piedmont
- Coordinates: 44°26′N 7°59′E
- Country: Italy
- Region: Piedmont
- Province: Cuneo (CN)

Government
  - Mayor: Carla Merletti

Area
  - Total: 11.52 km^{2} (4.45 sq mi)
- Elevation: 613 m (2,011 ft)

Population (30 November 2017)
  - Total: 293
  - Density: 25.4/km^{2} (65.9/sq mi)
- Demonym: Castellinesi
- Time zone: UTC+1 (CET)
  - Summer (DST): UTC+2 (CEST)
- Postal code: 12060
- Dialing code: 0174
- Website: Official website

Castellino Tanaro (Piedmontese: Castlin Tane) is a comune (municipality) in the Province of Cuneo in the Italian region Piedmont, located about 70 kilometres (43 mi) southeast of Turin and about 35 kilometres (22 mi) east of Cuneo.

Castellino Tanaro borders the following municipalities: Ceva, Igliano, Lesegno, Marsaglia, Niella Tanaro, Roascio, and Rocca Cigliè.

== Twin towns ==
Castellino Tanaro is twinned with:

- Falicon, France (2004)
