= Lesegno =

- Comune
- Comune di Lesegno
- Location within Italy Location within Piedmont
- Coordinates: 44°24′N 7°58′E
- Country: Italy
- Region: Piedmont
- Province: Province of Cuneo (CN)

Area
  - Total: 14.4 km^{2} (5.6 sq mi)
- Elevation: 422 m (1,385 ft)

Population (Dec. 2004)
  - Total: 868
  - Density: 60.3/km^{2} (156/sq mi)
- Demonym: Lesegnesi
- Time zone: UTC+1 (CET)
  - Summer (DST): UTC+2 (CEST)
- Postal code: 12076
- Dialing code: 0174

Lesegno is a comune (municipality) in the Province of Cuneo in the Italian region Piedmont, located about 80 kilometres (50 mi) southeast of Turin and about 35 kilometres (22 mi) east of Cuneo. As of 31 December 2004, it had a population of 868 and an area of 14.4 square kilometres (5.6 mi^{2}).

Lesegno borders the following municipalities: Castellino Tanaro, Ceva, Mombasiglio, Niella Tanaro, and San Michele Mondovì.

== History ==
Lesegno's history starts in middle age, when in the 11th century, it was given firstly at the March of Turin, then at Asti's bishop and finally at the close Marquisate of Ceva. In 1525, the plague depopulated the village. In 1531 the emperor Charles V, donated Asti's domain and Marquisate of Ceva to Beatrice of Portugal, Duchess of Savoy, so Lesegno will follow House of Savoy's story.

== Demographic evolution ==
Historical population

Year	Pop.	±%
1861	1,492	—
1871	1,679	+12.5%
1881	1,660	−1.1%
1901	1,553	−6.4%
1911	1,513	−2.6%

Year	Pop.	±%
1921	1,437	−5.0%
1931	1,241	−13.6%
1936	1,289	+3.9%
1951	1,153	−10.6%
1961	958	−16.9%

Year	Pop.	±%
1971	878	−8.4%
1981	783	−10.8%
1991	787	+0.5%
2001	838	+6.5%

Source: Data from ISTAT
