= Igliano =

- Comune
- Comune di Igliano
- Location within Italy Location within Piedmont
- Coordinates: 44°27′N 8°1′E
- Country: Italy
- Region: Piedmont
- Province: Province of Cuneo (CN)

Area
  - Total: 3.4 km^{2} (1.3 sq mi)

Population (Dec. 2004)
  - Total: 80
  - Density: 24/km^{2} (61/sq mi)
- Time zone: UTC+1 (CET)
  - Summer (DST): UTC+2 (CEST)
- Postal code: 12060
- Dialing code: 0174

Igliano is a comune (municipality) in the Province of Cuneo in the Italian region Piedmont, about 70 kilometres (43 mi) southeast of Turin and about 40 kilometres (25 mi) east of Cuneo, with an area of 3.4 square kilometres (1.3 mi^{2}). As of 31 December 2004 it had a population of 80.

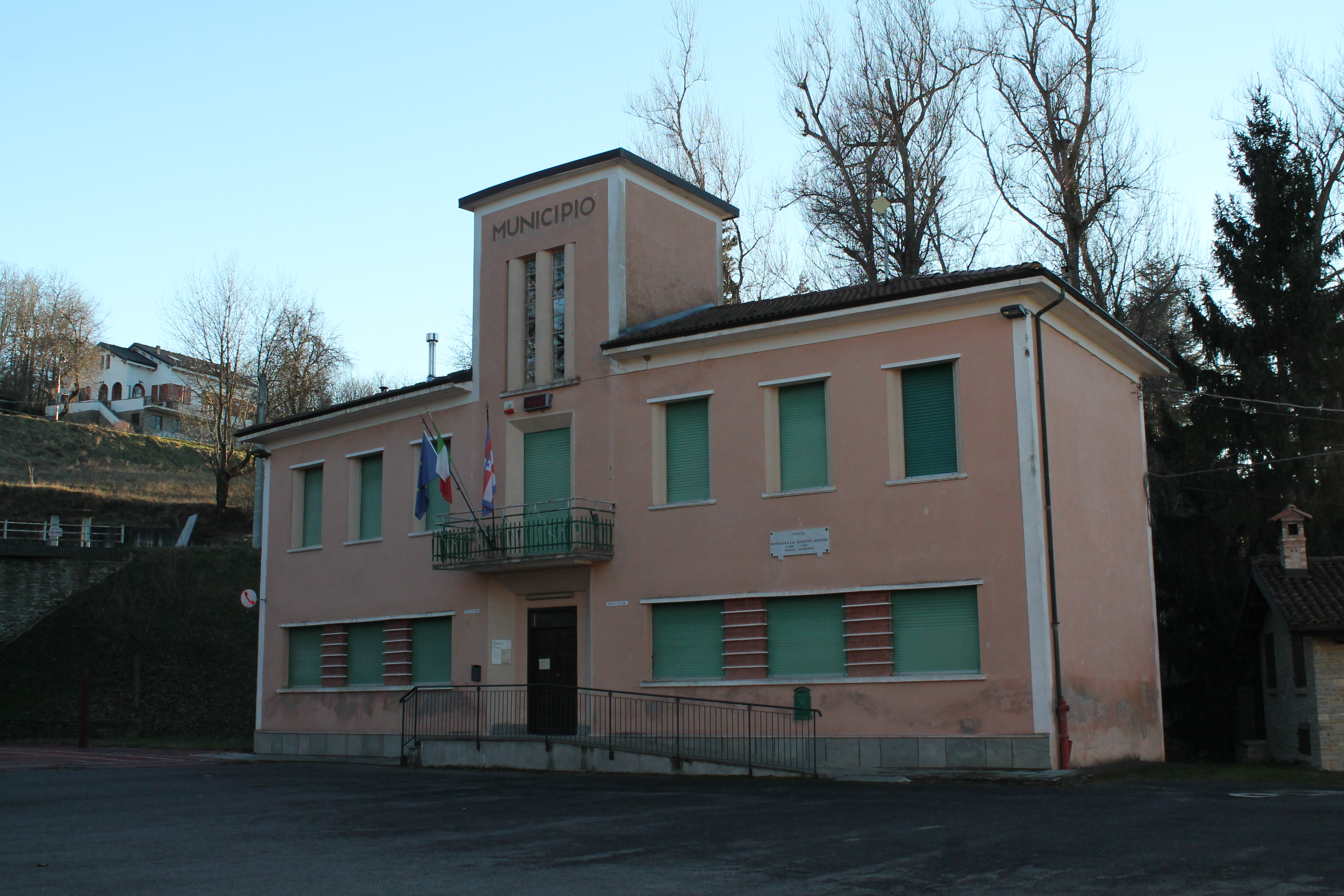
Town Hall of Igliano

Igliano borders the municipalities of Castellino Tanaro, Marsaglia, Murazzano, Roascio, and Torresina.

== Demographic evolution ==
Historical population

Year	Pop.	±%
1861	369	—
1871	374	+1.4%
1881	343	−8.3%
1901	338	−1.5%
1911	343	+1.5%

Year	Pop.	±%
1921	369	+7.6%
1931	309	−16.3%
1936	312	+1.0%
1951	257	−17.6%
1961	188	−26.8%

Year	Pop.	±%
1971	130	−30.9%
1981	115	−11.5%
1991	97	−15.7%
2001	81	−16.5%

Source: Data from ISTAT
