= Niella Belbo =

- Comune
- Comune di Niella Belbo
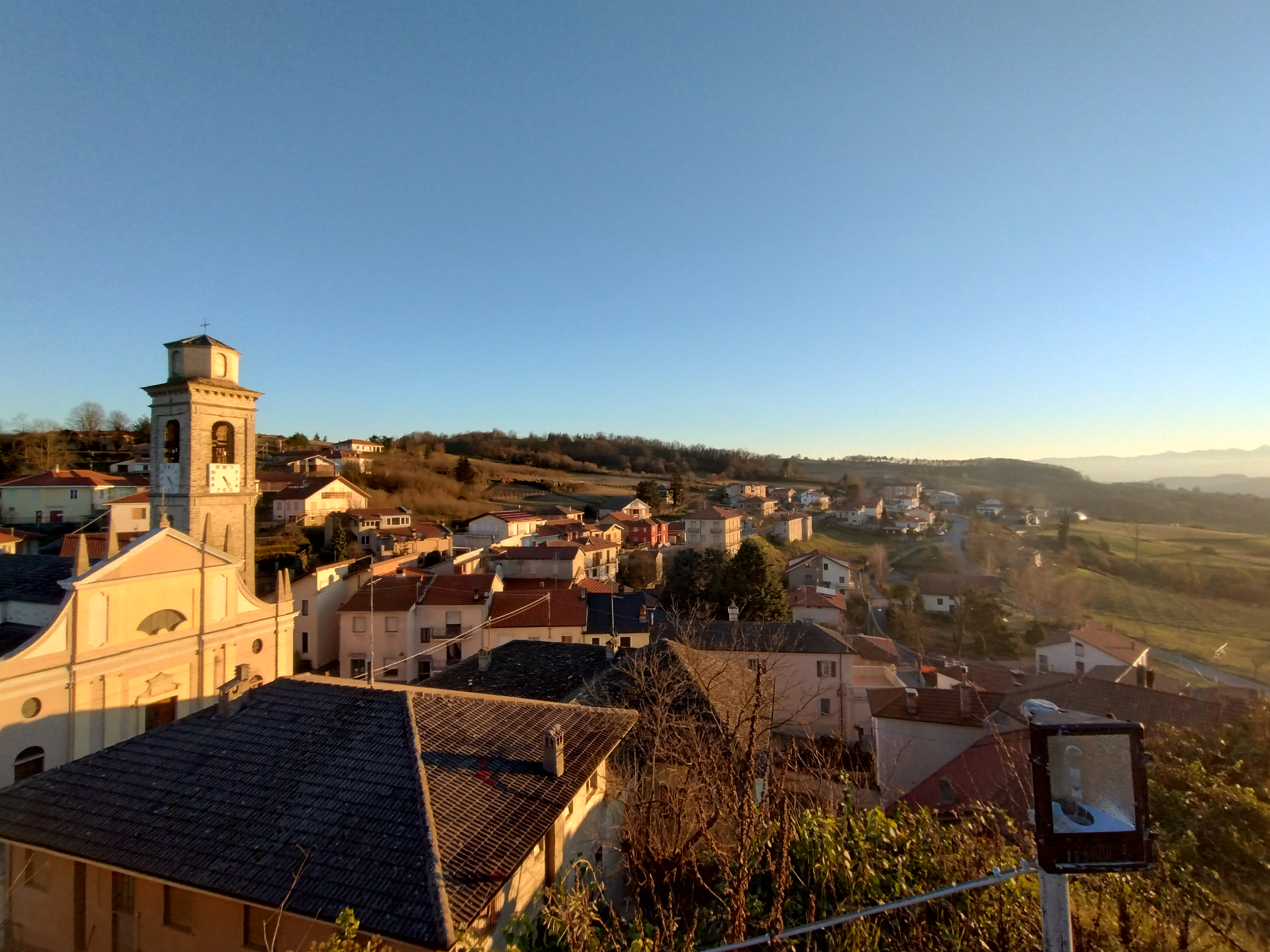

- Location within Italy Location within Piedmont
- Coordinates: 44°31′N 8°5′E
- Country: Italy
- Region: Piedmont
- Province: Province of Cuneo (CN)

Area
  - Total: 11.5 km^{2} (4.4 sq mi)

Population (Dec. 2004)
  - Total: 424
  - Density: 36.9/km^{2} (95.5/sq mi)
- Time zone: UTC+1 (CET)
  - Summer (DST): UTC+2 (CEST)
- Postal code: 12050
- Dialing code: 0173

Niella Belbo is a comune (municipality) in the Province of Cuneo in the Italian region Piedmont, located about 70 kilometres (43 mi) southeast of Turin and about 45 kilometres (28 mi) northeast of Cuneo. As of 31 December 2004, it had a population of 424 and an area of 11.5 square kilometres (4.4 mi^{2}).

Niella Belbo borders the following municipalities: Bossolasco, Feisoglio, Gorzegno, Mombarcaro, and San Benedetto Belbo.

== Demographic evolution ==
Historical population

Year	Pop.	±%
1861	805	—
1871	836	+3.9%
1881	896	+7.2%
1901	832	−7.1%
1911	806	−3.1%

Year	Pop.	±%
1921	834	+3.5%
1931	842	+1.0%
1936	845	+0.4%
1951	837	−0.9%
1961	699	−16.5%

Year	Pop.	±%
1971	581	−16.9%
1981	511	−12.0%
1991	457	−10.6%
2001	421	−7.9%

Source: Data from ISTAT
