= San Benedetto Belbo =

- Comune
- Comune di San Benedetto Belbo
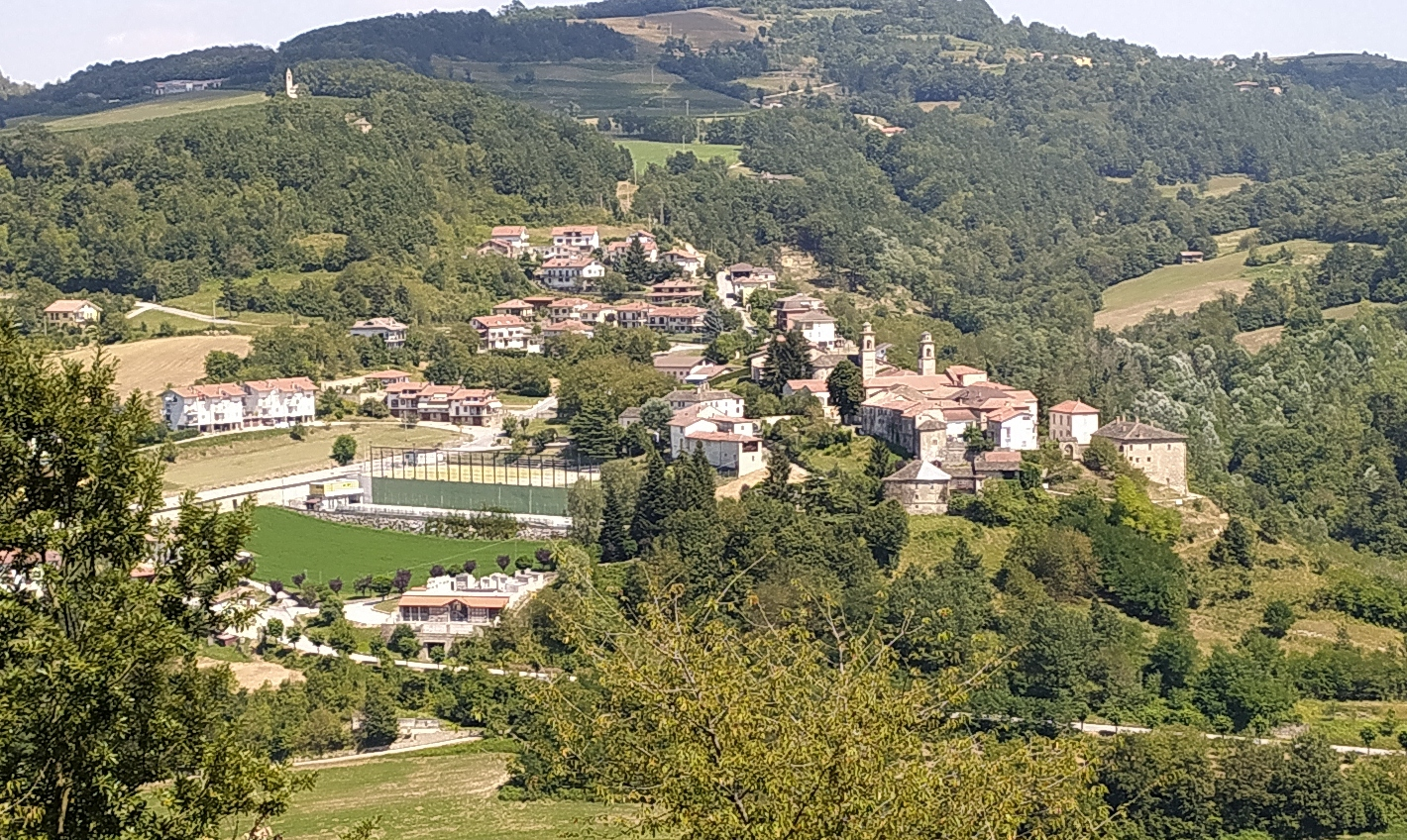

- Location within Italy Location within Piedmont
- Coordinates: 44°30′N 8°3′E
- Country: Italy
- Region: Piedmont
- Province: Province of Cuneo (CN)

Area
  - Total: 5.0 km^{2} (1.9 sq mi)

Population (Dec. 2004)
  - Total: 190
  - Density: 38/km^{2} (98/sq mi)
- Time zone: UTC+1 (CET)
  - Summer (DST): UTC+2 (CEST)
- Postal code: 12050
- Dialing code: 0173

San Benedetto Belbo is a comune (municipality) in the Province of Cuneo in the Italian region Piedmont, located about 70 kilometres (43 mi) southeast of Turin and about 40 kilometres (25 mi) northeast of Cuneo. As of 31 December 2004, it had a population of 190 and an area of 5.0 square kilometres (1.9 mi^{2}).

San Benedetto Belbo borders the following municipalities: Bossolasco, Mombarcaro, Murazzano, and Niella Belbo.

== Demographic evolution ==
Historical population

Year	Pop.	±%
1861	470	—
1871	539	+14.7%
1881	495	−8.2%
1901	501	+1.2%
1911	468	−6.6%

Year	Pop.	±%
1921	482	+3.0%
1931	449	−6.8%
1936	461	+2.7%
1951	418	−9.3%
1961	282	−32.5%

Year	Pop.	±%
1971	202	−28.4%
1981	215	+6.4%
1991	202	−6.0%
2001	192	−5.0%

Source: Data from ISTAT
