= Cigliè =

Cigliè Sijé (Piedmontese)
- Comune
- Comune di Cigliè
- Location within Italy Location within Piedmont
- Coordinates: 44°26′N 7°56′E
- Country: Italy
- Region: Piedmont
- Province: Province of Cuneo (CN)

Area
  - Total: 6.0 km^{2} (2.3 sq mi)

Population (Dec. 2004)
  - Total: 185
  - Density: 31/km^{2} (80/sq mi)
- Time zone: UTC+1 (CET)
  - Summer (DST): UTC+2 (CEST)
- Postal code: 12060
- Dialing code: 0174

Cigliè (Italian: [tʃiʎˈʎɛ]; Piedmontese: Sijé) is a comune (municipality) in the Province of Cuneo in the Italian region Piedmont, located about 70 kilometres (43 mi) south of Turin and about 30 kilometres (19 mi) east of Cuneo. As of 31 December 2004, it had a population of 185, and an area of 6.0 square kilometres (2.3 mi^{2}).

Cigliè borders the following municipalities: Bastia Mondovì, Clavesana, Mondovì, Niella Tanaro, and Rocca Cigliè.

== Demographic evolution ==
Historical population

| Year | Pop. | ±% |
|---|---|---|
| 1861 | 619 | — |
| 1871 | 623 | +0.6% |
| 1881 | 670 | +7.5% |
| 1901 | 742 | +10.7% |
| 1911 | 671 | −9.6% |

| Year | Pop. | ±% |
|---|---|---|
| 1921 | 625 | −6.9% |
| 1931 | 636 | +1.8% |
| 1936 | 599 | −5.8% |
| 1951 | 526 | −12.2% |
| 1961 | 386 | −26.6% |

| Year | Pop. | ±% |
|---|---|---|
| 1971 | 292 | −24.4% |
| 1981 | 249 | −14.7% |
| 1991 | 197 | −20.9% |
| 2001 | 188 | −4.6% |

Source: Data from ISTAT
