= Paroldo =

- Comune
- Comune di Paroldo
- Coat of arms

- Location within Italy Location within Piedmont
- Coordinates: 44°25′54″N 8°04′19″E
- Country: Italy
- Region: Piedmont
- Province: Province of Cuneo (CN)

Area
  - Total: 12.6 km^{2} (4.9 sq mi)

Population (Dec. 2004)
  - Total: 239
  - Density: 19.0/km^{2} (49.1/sq mi)
- Time zone: UTC+1 (CET)
  - Summer (DST): UTC+2 (CEST)
- Postal code: 12070
- Dialing code: 0174

Paroldo is a comune (municipality) in the Province of Cuneo in the Italian region Piedmont, located about 80 kilometres (50 mi) southeast of Turin and about 40 kilometres (25 mi) east of Cuneo. As of 31 December 2004, it had a population of 239 and an area of 12.6 square kilometres (4.9 mi^{2}).

Paroldo borders the following municipalities: Ceva, Mombarcaro, Murazzano, Roascio, Sale San Giovanni, and Torresina.

== Demographic evolution ==
Historical population

Year	Pop.	±%
1861	752	—
1871	784	+4.3%
1881	745	−5.0%
1901	703	−5.6%
1911	683	−2.8%

Year	Pop.	±%
1921	684	+0.1%
1931	681	−0.4%
1936	674	−1.0%
1951	601	−10.8%
1961	494	−17.8%

Year	Pop.	±%
1971	345	−30.2%
1981	285	−17.4%
1991	249	−12.6%
2001	246	−1.2%

Source: Data from ISTAT
