= Pamparato =

- Comune
- Comune di Pamparato
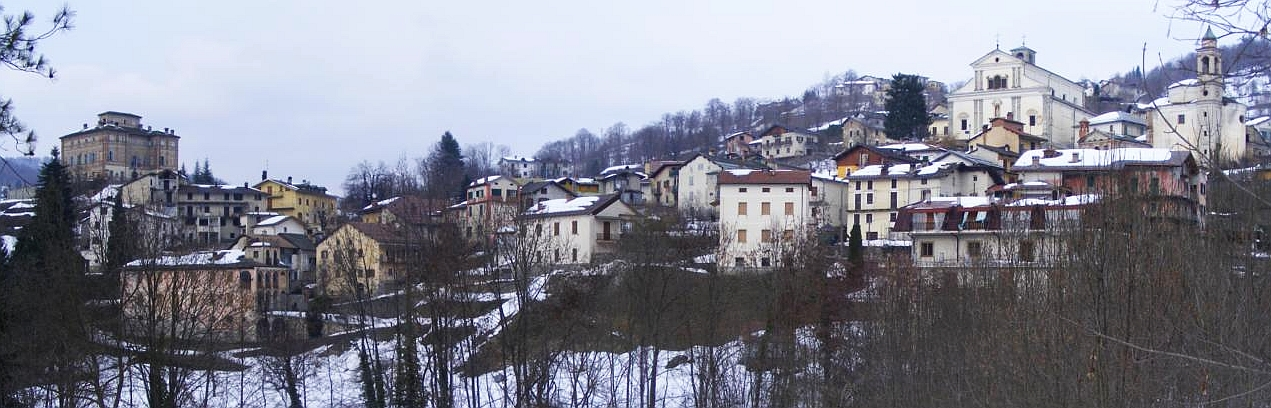

- Location within Italy Location within Piedmont
- Coordinates: 44°17′N 7°55′E
- Country: Italy
- Region: Piedmont
- Province: Cuneo (CN)

Government
  - Mayor: Fausto Mulattieri

Area
  - Total: 35.0 km^{2} (13.5 sq mi)
- Elevation: 816 m (2,677 ft)

Population (31 December 2017)
  - Total: 298
  - Density: 8.51/km^{2} (22.1/sq mi)
- Demonym: Pamparatesi
- Time zone: UTC+1 (CET)
  - Summer (DST): UTC+2 (CEST)
- Postal code: 12087
- Dialing code: 0174
- Website: Official website

Pamparato is a comune (municipality) in the Province of Cuneo in the Italian region Piedmont, located about 90 kilometres (56 mi) south of Turin and about 30 kilometres (19 mi) southeast of Cuneo.

Pamparato borders the following municipalities: Garessio, Monasterolo Casotto, Roburent, Torre Mondovì, and Viola.
