= Torresina =

- Comune
- Comune di Torresina
- Location within Italy Location within Piedmont
- Coordinates: 44°26′N 8°2′E
- Country: Italy
- Region: Piedmont
- Province: Province of Cuneo (CN)

Area
  - Total: 3.8 km^{2} (1.5 sq mi)
- Elevation: 704 m (2,310 ft)

Population (Dec. 2004)
  - Total: 64
  - Density: 17/km^{2} (44/sq mi)
- Demonym: Torresinesi
- Time zone: UTC+1 (CET)
  - Summer (DST): UTC+2 (CEST)
- Postal code: 12070
- Dialing code: 0174
- Website: Official website

Torresina is a comune (municipality) in the Province of Cuneo in the Italian region Piedmont, located about 80 kilometres (50 mi) southeast of Turin and about 40 kilometres (25 mi) east of Cuneo. As of 31 December 2004, it had a population of 64 and an area of 3.8 square kilometres (1.5 mi^{2}).

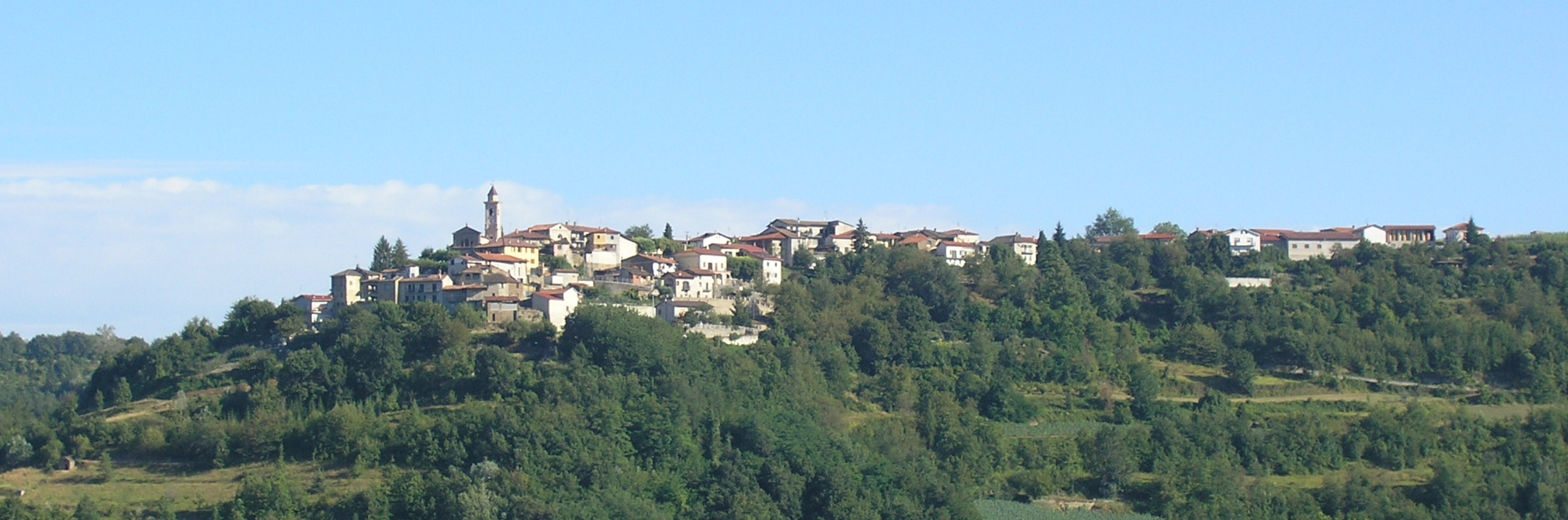

Torresina borders the following municipalities: Igliano, Murazzano, Paroldo, and Roascio.

== Demographic evolution ==
Historical population

Year	Pop.	±%
1861	269	—
1871	242	−10.0%
1881	255	+5.4%
1901	254	−0.4%
1911	267	+5.1%

Year	Pop.	±%
1921	286	+7.1%
1931	314	+9.8%
1936	301	−4.1%
1951	274	−9.0%
1961	220	−19.7%

Year	Pop.	±%
1971	150	−31.8%
1981	110	−26.7%
1991	84	−23.6%
2001	67	−20.2%

Source: Data from ISTAT
