= Teobaldo Roggeri =

Italian Roman Catholic saint

Blessed Teobaldo Roggeri
- Born: 1100; Vicoforte di Mondovì, Liguria, Holy Roman Empire
- Died: 1150 (aged 50); Vicoforte di Mondovì, Liguria, Holy Roman Empire
- Venerated in: Roman Catholic Church
- Beatified: 1841, Saint Peter's Basilica by Pope Gregory XVI
- Major shrine: Alba Cathedral
- Feast: 1 June

Teobaldo Roggeri (1100 - 1150) was an Italian Roman Catholic shoemaker and porter from the Ligurian province noted for his simple manner of living and for his commitment to the needs of the poor of the Diocese of Alba.

Roggeri received his beatification from Pope Gregory XVI in 1841 after the pontiff confirmed that there was a significant 'cultus' (or popular and longstanding devotion) to the tradesman.

== Life ==
Teobaldo Roggeri was born in the Ligurian region to nobles from Piedmont in 1100. The careful reading and attentiveness to the Gospel caused him to abandon his noble status in favor of a simple and austere life. He was orphaned of both his parents during his childhood so set off for Alba in 1112 where he became an apprentice to a shoemaker.

Roggeri worked as a cobbler and proved to be quite skilled in his trade which prompted the master to hope in vain that Roggeri would wed his daughter Virida and continue the business after his death; however the apprentice instead made a private vow to remain chaste. He also worked as a porter and spent time transporting sacks of grain from place to place as part of his job. His master died in 1122 after a decade of working with Roggeri. This prompted Roggeri to embark on a solemn pilgrimage - with a bundle and a staff - to the Santiago de Compostela Cathedral in Spain and he later returned to Alba to resume his work. He used his meager income to help the poor of his region and he often slept outside the local church.

On one occasion the owner of the shoe store where he worked asked that he take a sack of wheat to the mill to be ground into flour. He agreed but gave handful after handful to the poor people that he encountered along the path to the point where no more wheat remained. He lacked the courage to face the woman back at the store and refused to go back without something to return so he filled the bag with sand and left it on the woman's doorstep before running off. The woman found flour in the bag though later learned of what had happened. This began the tale of the so-called "miracle of the flour" and happened not long before his death.

Roggeri died in 1150 after contracting a serious illness while visiting the widow of a cobbler. Per his request he was buried in an unmarked patch of ground between the two churches of San Lorenzo and San Silvestro. His grave became a place of pilgrimage and miracles. After several decades his grave grew obscure and became lost. His remains were rediscovered late in the evening of 21 January 1429 by the Bishop of Alba Alerino Rambaudi; the legend is that the church bells rang out on their own at sunrise on 1 February 1429 in celebration of the find. His remains are now enshrined in the Alba Cathedral.

== Beatification ==
The confirmation of the popular devotion of Roggeri in 1841 acted as the formal conferral of beatification from Pope Gregory XVI.
