= Monte Fantino =

Mountain in Italy

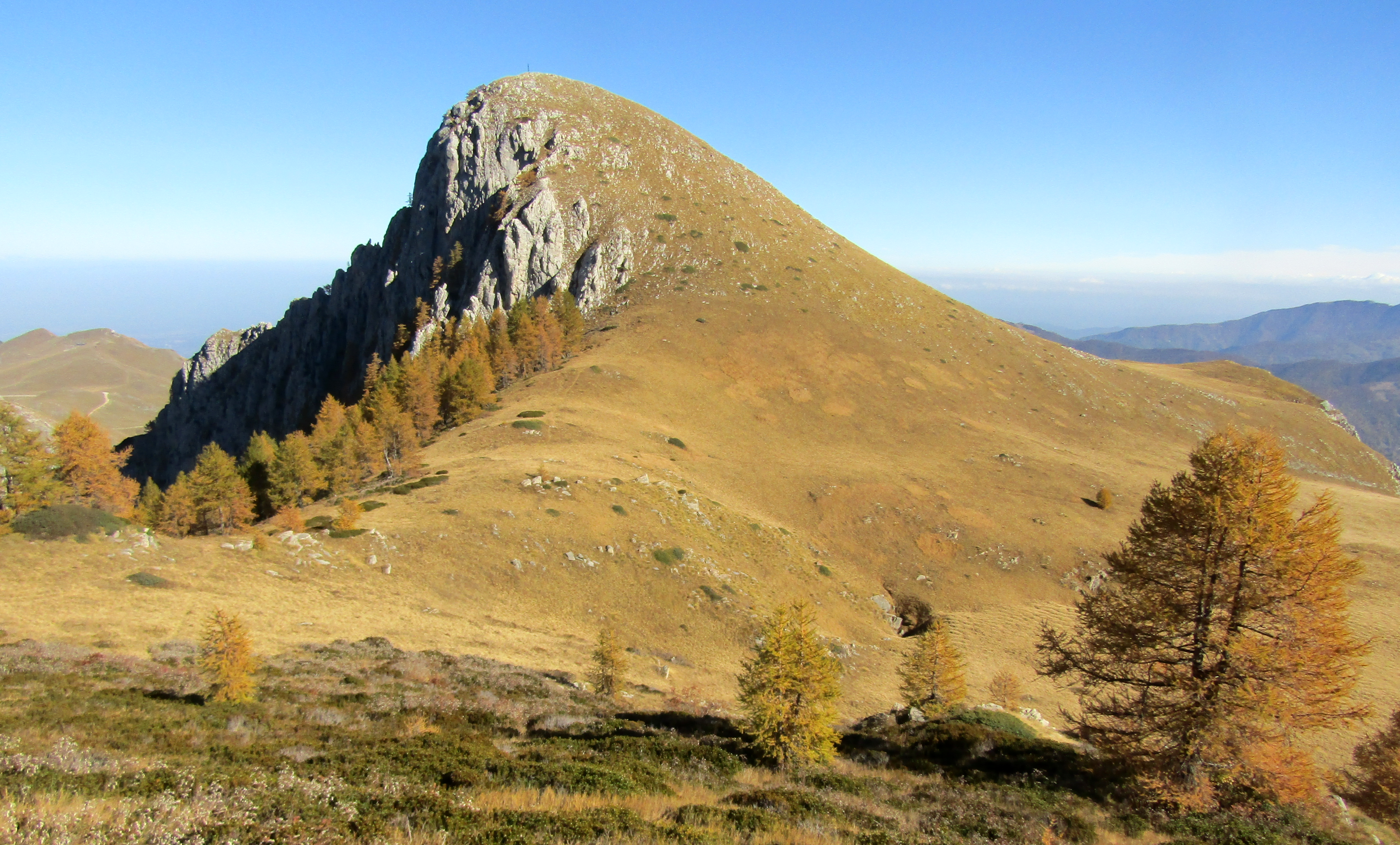
- Monte Fantino and Pian Camozzera

Highest point
- Elevation: 2,094 m (6,870 ft)
- Prominence: 161 m (528 ft)
- Coordinates: 44°13′11″N 7°47′38″E

Geography
- Location within Alps
- Location: Piemonte, Italy
- Parent range: Ligurian Alps

Climbing
- First ascent: ancestral
- Easiest route: hiking

The Monte Fantino is a mountain of the Ligurian Alps located in the Piedmont region of northwestern Italy.

== Geography ==
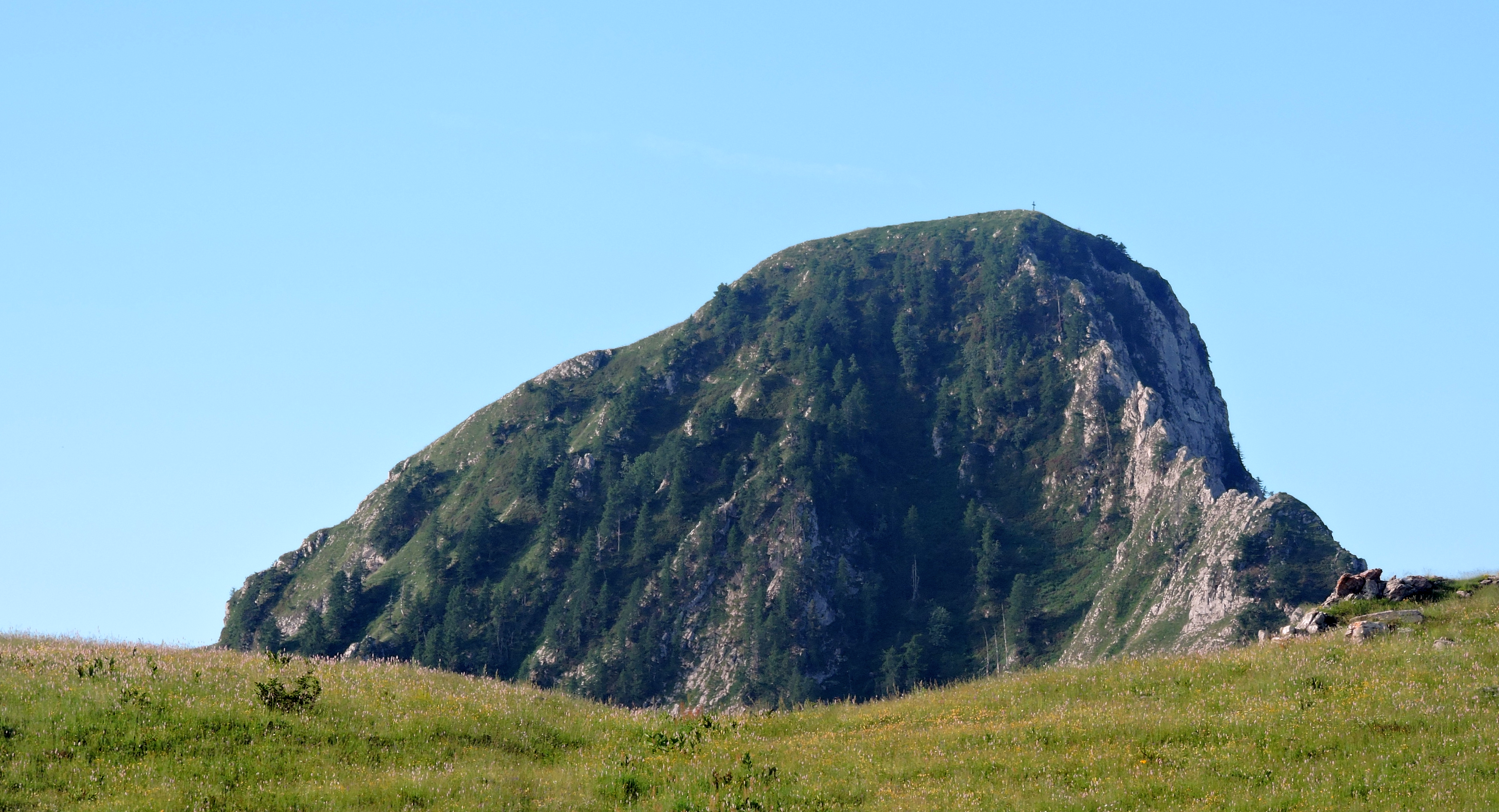
North face

The mountain stands on the ridge dividing the small valleys of Rio Sbornina and Rio Sotto Crosa, both tributary of the Corsaglia. The ridge starts from Cima della Brignola, descends till to the Bocchino della Brignola (2.276 m), rises again up to Cima Ferlette and follows with the del Punta Lusco (2.277 m) and Monte Fantino, ending at the confluence between the two streams, close to the "Stalle Buroch" ("Buroch's stables"). Monte Fantino summit is marked by a cross; its prominence is 161 m. The east side of the mountain features steep and even grassy slopes, while its NW face overhangs rio Sbornina valley with a rocky wall of almost 500 metres drop. Administratively the mountain belongs to the comune of Frabosa Soprana.

=== SOIUSA classification ===
According to the SOIUSA (International Standardized Mountain Subdivision of the Alps) the mountain can be classified in the following way:

- main part = Western Alps
- major sector = South Western Alps
- section = Ligurian Alps
- subsection = It:Alpi del Marguareis/Fr:Alpes Liguriennes Occidentales
- supergroup = It:Catena Marguareis-Mongioie/Fr:Chaîne Marguareis-Mongioie
- group = It:Gruppo Mongioie-Mondolè
- subgroup = It:Dorsale Cima Brignola-Mondolè
- code = I/A-1.II-B.4.b

== Geology ==
Monte Fantino stands in a karstic area. Around the mountain have been discovered some caves.

== Access to the summit ==
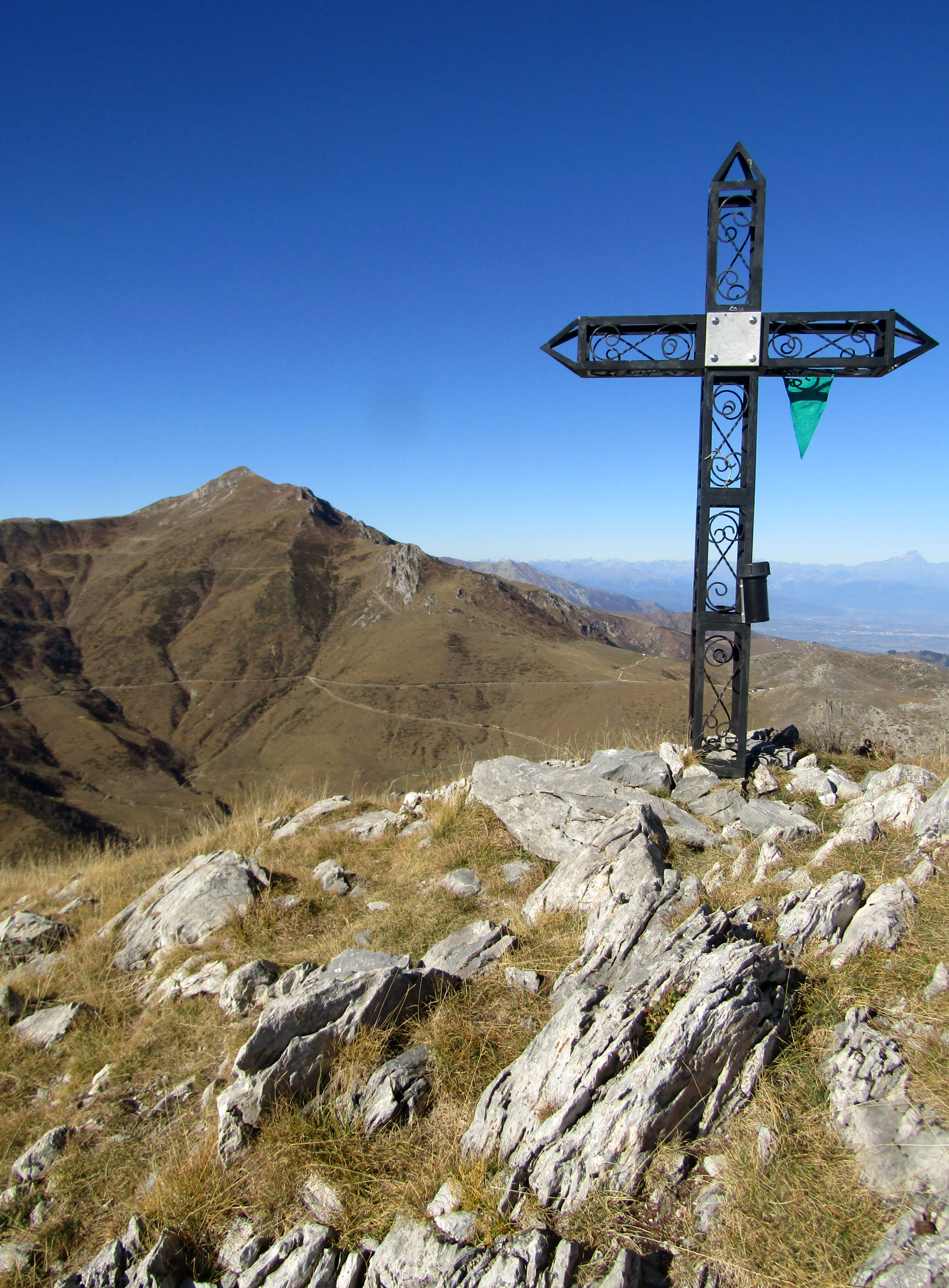
Summit cross

=== Summer ===
The summit of Monte Fantino can be reached with an hike starting from the saddle known as Sella Brignola (1.933 m), which can be accessed either from the Corsaglia valley (Ponte di Murao) or from the Rifugio della Balma. On the sw rocky wall have been traced some classic climbing routes.

=== Winter ===
The Monte Fantino can be reached in winter by some Ski mountaineering from different places; a well known itinerary starts from Prato Nevoso. Its difficulty rate is considered BS (Skilled skiers).

== Mountain huts ==
- Rifugio Balma, on the Maudagna/Corsaglia water divide.

== Bibliography ==
- Sergio Marazzi, Atlante Orografico delle Alpi. SOIUSA. Pavone Canavese (TO), Priuli & Verlucca editori, 2005.
- Montagna, Euro; Montaldo, Lorenzo (1981). "Alpi Liguri". Guida dei Monti d'Italia (in Italian). CAI-TCI.

== Maps ==
- Cartografia ufficiale italiana in scala 1:25.000 e 1:100.000 (Map). Istituto Geografico Militare.
- Carta in scala 1:50.000 n. 8 Alpi Marittime e Liguri (Map). Torino: Istituto Geografico Centrale.
- 1:25.000 map nr.22 "Mondovì, Val Ellero, Val Maudagna, Val Corsaglia, Val Casotto" (Map). Ciriè: Fraternali.

Media related to Monte Fantino at Wikimedia Commons
