= Viola, Piedmont =

Viola
- Comune
- Comune di Viola
- Location within Italy Location within Piedmont
- Coordinates: 44°17′N 7°58′E
- Country: Italy
- Region: Piedmont
- Province: Province of Cuneo (CN)

Government
  - Mayor: Giancarlo Rossi

Area
  - Total: 21.1 km^{2} (8.1 sq mi)

Population (Dec. 2004)
  - Total: 470
  - Density: 22/km^{2} (58/sq mi)
- Time zone: UTC+1 (CET)
  - Summer (DST): UTC+2 (CEST)
- Postal code: 12070
- Dialing code: 0174

Viola is a comune (municipality) in the Province of Cuneo in the Italian region Piedmont, located about 90 km (56 mi) south of Turin and about 35 km (22 mi) southeast of Cuneo. As of 31 December 2004, it had a population of 470 and an area of 21.1 km^{2} (8.1 sq mi).

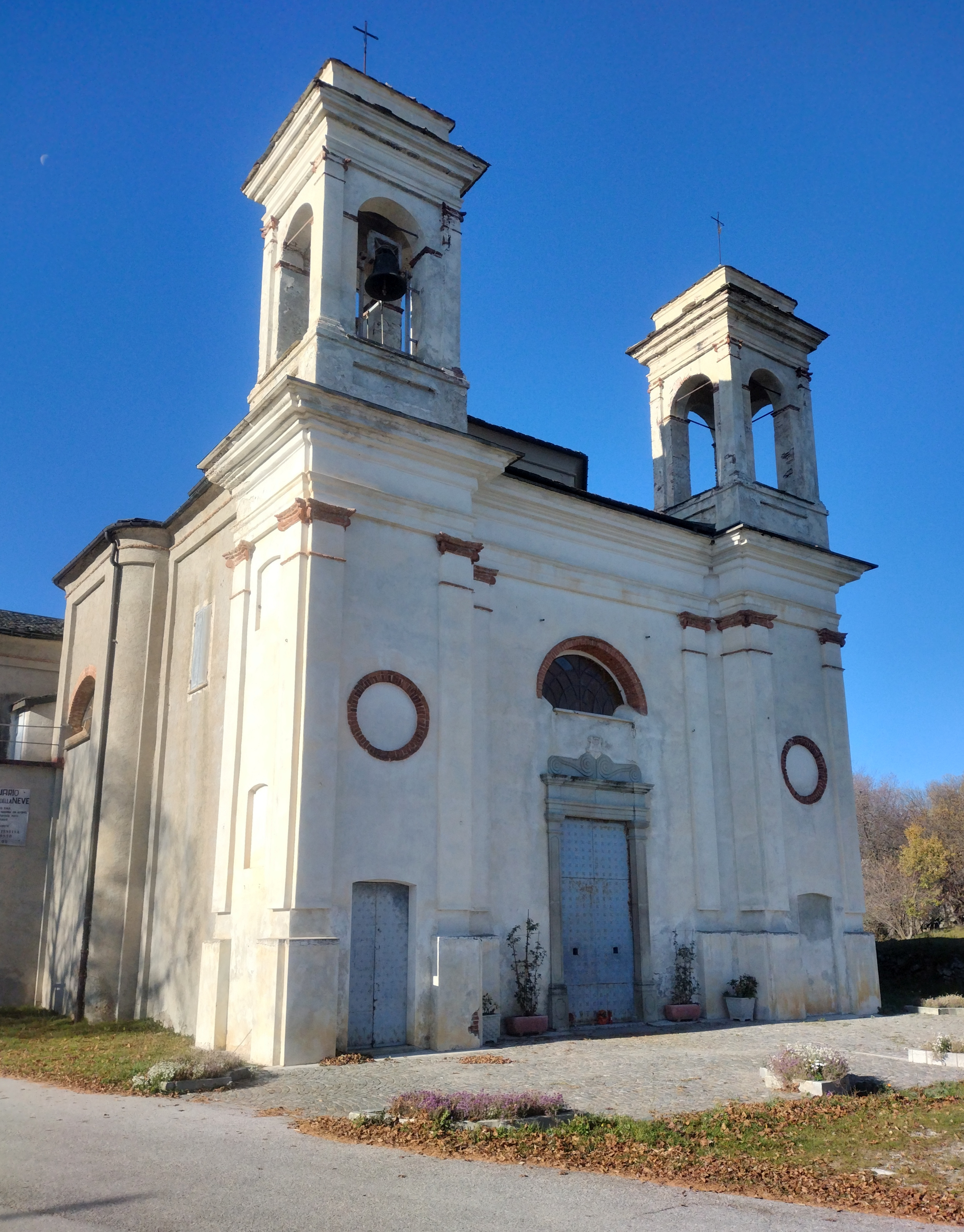
Santuario della Madonna della Neve, in Viola, Piedmont

Viola borders the following municipalities: Bagnasco, Garessio, Lisio, Monasterolo Casotto, Pamparato, and Priola.

== Demographic evolution ==
Historical population

Year	Pop.	±%
1861	1,338	—
1871	1,416	+5.8%
1881	1,452	+2.5%
1901	1,354	−6.7%
1911	1,305	−3.6%

Year	Pop.	±%
1921	1,339	+2.6%
1931	1,249	−6.7%
1936	1,148	−8.1%
1951	1,092	−4.9%
1961	782	−28.4%

Year	Pop.	±%
1971	661	−15.5%
1981	597	−9.7%
1991	498	−16.6%
2001	461	−7.4%

Source: Data from ISTAT
