= Roascio =

- Comune
- Comune di Roascio
- Location within Italy Location within Piedmont
- Coordinates: 44°25′N 8°2′E
- Country: Italy
- Region: Piedmont
- Province: Cuneo (CN)

Government
  - Mayor: Aldo Minazzo

Area
  - Total: 6.42 km^{2} (2.48 sq mi)
- Elevation: 458 m (1,503 ft)

Population (31 December 2010)
  - Total: 82
  - Density: 13/km^{2} (33/sq mi)
- Demonym: Roaschesi
- Time zone: UTC+1 (CET)
  - Summer (DST): UTC+2 (CEST)
- Postal code: 12073
- Dialing code: 0174
- Website: Official website

Roascio is a comune (municipality) in the Province of Cuneo in the Italian region Piedmont, located about 80 kilometres (50 mi) southeast of Turin and about 40 kilometres (25 mi) east of Cuneo. It includes the hamlets of San Rocco, Sant'Anna, San Giovanni, and Mondoni.

Roascio borders the following municipalities: Castellino Tanaro, Ceva, Igliano, Paroldo, and Torresina.

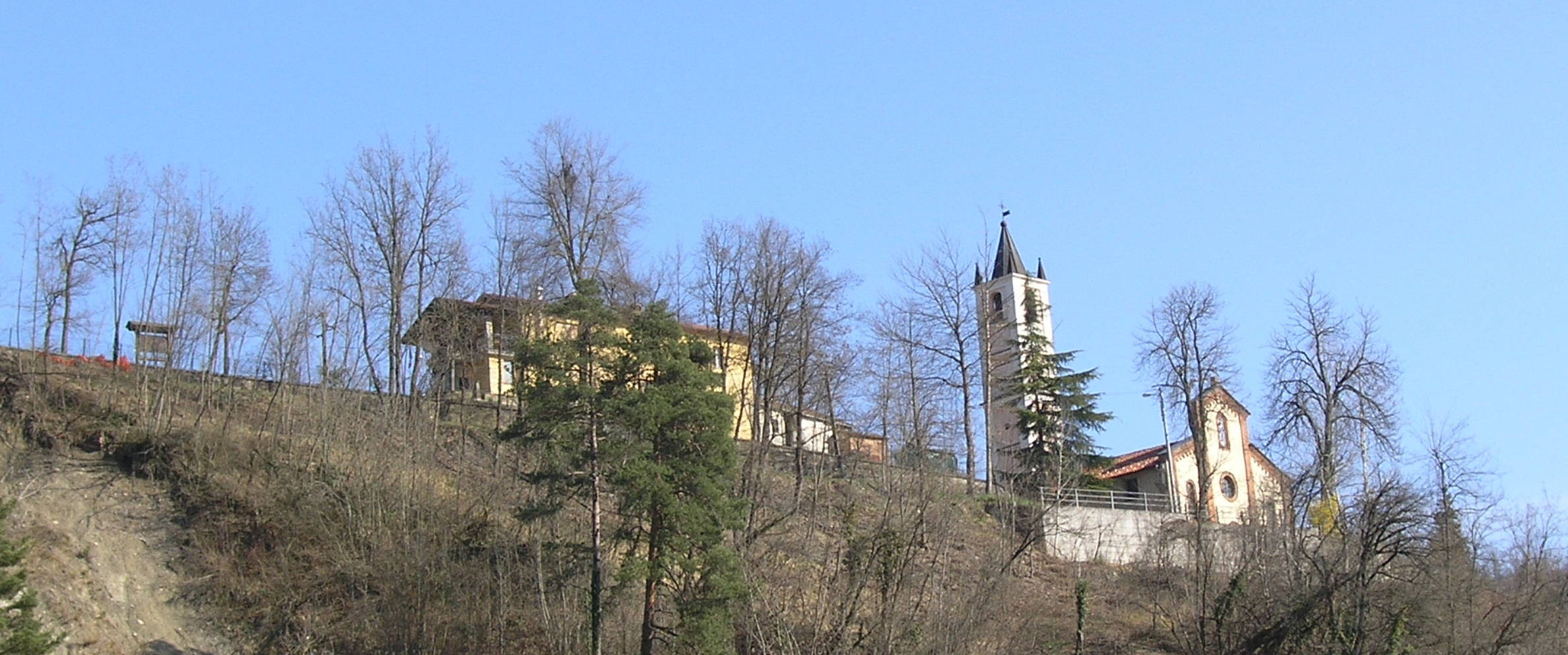
Landscape of Roascio
