= Roburent =

- Comune
- Comune di Roburent
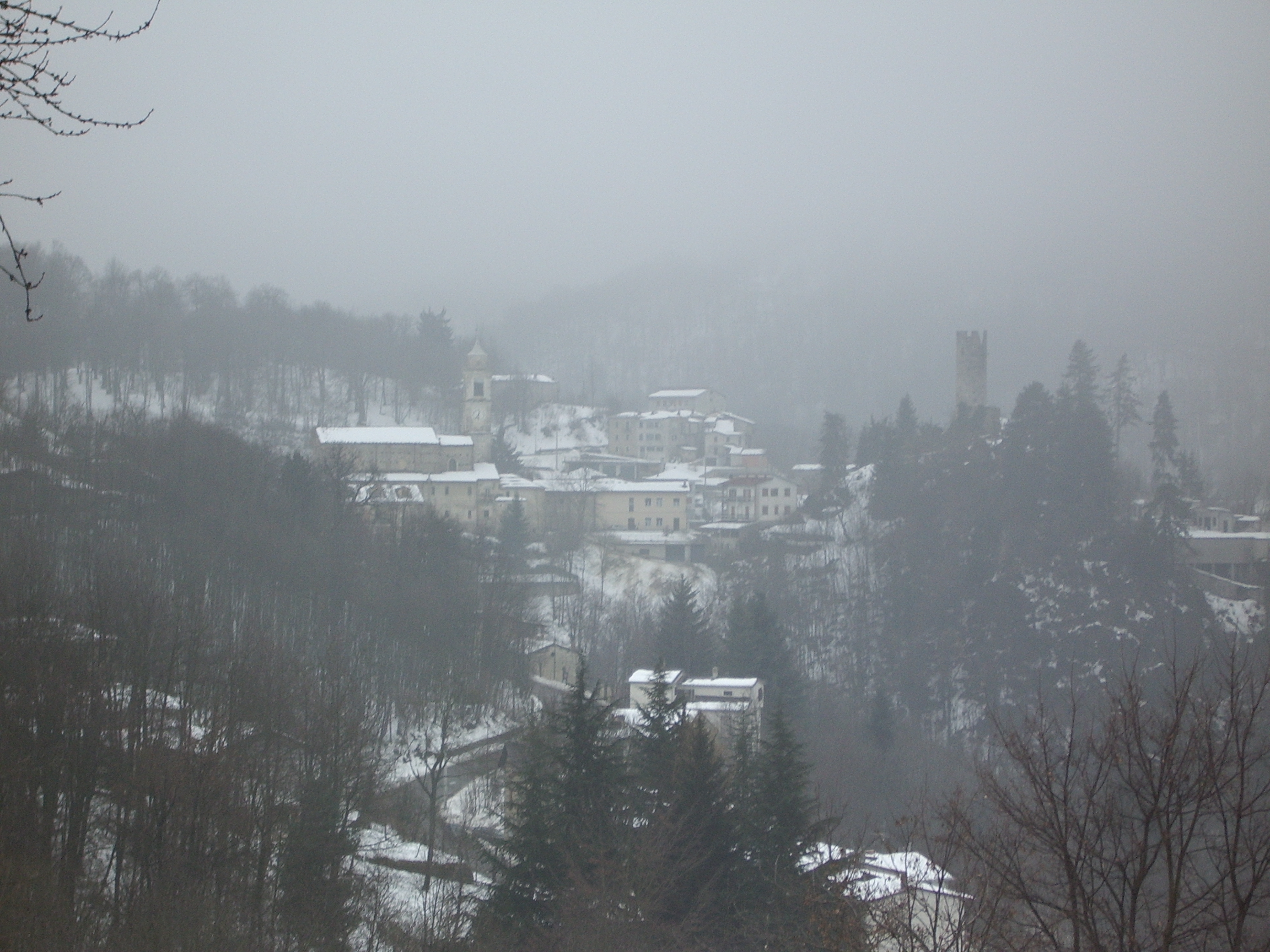
- Roburent in winter

- Location within Italy Location within Piedmont
- Coordinates: 44°19′N 7°53′E
- Country: Italy
- Region: Piedmont
- Province: Province of Cuneo (CN)
- Frazioni: Cardini, Pra, San Giacomo

Government
  - Mayor: Emiliano Negro (lista civica; elected 9 June 2024)

Area
  - Total: 29.9 km^{2} (11.5 sq mi)
- Elevation: 788 m (2,585 ft)

Population (1 January 2009)
  - Total: 552
  - Density: 18.5/km^{2} (47.8/sq mi)
- Demonym: Roburentesi
- Time zone: UTC+1 (CET)
  - Summer (DST): UTC+2 (CEST)
- Postal code: 12080
- Dialing code: 0174
- Website: www.comune.roburent.cn.it

Roburent (Italian pronunciation: [robuˈrɛnt]) is a comune (commune or municipality) of the Province of Cuneo in the Italian region Piedmont. It is located about 80 kilometres (50 mi) south of Turin and about 30 kilometres (19 mi) southeast of Cuneo. As of 1 January 2009 its population was 552. The comune extends over a largely wooded area of 29.9 km^{2} (11.5 sq mi) ranging in elevation from 580 to 1,819 metres (1,903 to 5,968 ft) above sea level and straddling the Corsaglia and Casotto valleys. It borders the municipalities of Frabosa Soprana, Garessio, Montaldo di Mondovì, Ormea, Pamparato, and Torre Mondovì.

== Population centres and trends ==
There are two main centres of population within the municipal boundaries. Roburent itself, which stands at 788 metres (2,585 ft) above sea level, is the capoluogo and site of the municipal administration; it had 183 inhabitants at the time of the 2001 census. San Giacomo at 1,011 metres (3,317 ft) had a resident population of 247. Istat identified Pra (1014 m, pop. 12) as the third well-defined ‘populated centre’ (centro abitato). There were also eight minor settlements classified as ‘populated nuclei’ (nuclei abitati): Cardini (1153 m, pop. 35), Costacalda (1135 m, pop. 6), Mondini (920 m, pop. 14), Montà (780 m, pop. 12), Mottoni (964 m, pop. 2), Nasi (850 m, pop. 9), Patelle (1114 m, pop. 7), and Zitella (800 m, pop. 8).

Since the First World War there has been a steady decline in the population of the comune, from a maximum of 1919 in 1911 to 552 at the start of 2009. The following graph is based on figures from the official censuses which have taken place since the unification of Italy.

Historical population

Year	Pop.	±%
1861	1,720	—
1871	1,757	+2.2%
1881	1,729	−1.6%
1901	1,751	+1.3%
1911	1,919	+9.6%

Year	Pop.	±%
1921	1,679	−12.5%
1931	1,556	−7.3%
1936	1,444	−7.2%
1951	1,263	−12.5%
1961	992	−21.5%

Year	Pop.	±%
1971	782	−21.2%
1981	702	−10.2%
1991	623	−11.3%
2001	565	−9.3%

Source: Data from ISTAT
