= Bastia Mondovì =

Bastia Mondovì Bastìa (Piedmontese)
- Comune
- Comune di Bastia Mondovì
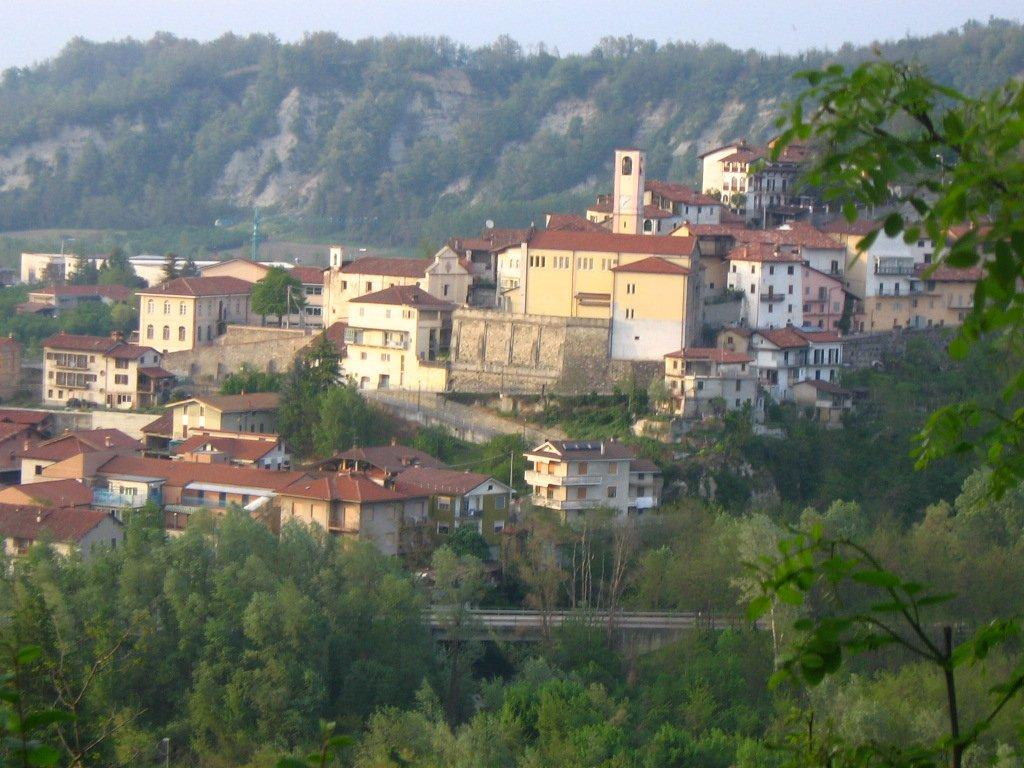

- Location within Italy Location within Piedmont
- Coordinates: 44°27′N 7°54′E
- Country: Italy
- Region: Piedmont
- Province: Cuneo (CN)
- Frazioni: Alfieri, Bonde, Braia, Bricco, Cantonata, Carpenea, Chionetti, Coste, Deiso, Feia, Fossaretto, Fratti, Gallo, Gattera, Gava, Ghesio, Isola, Lavoruzzo, Le Torri, Minetti Soprani, Minetti Sottani, Mirabello, Montechiaro, Murazze, Oderda, Paradiso, Perosi, Pianmezzano, Pieve, Rocche, San Fiorenzo, Scarpito, Sciolle, Stazione, Valle Ellero, Villero

Government
  - Mayor: Rinaldo Elladi

Area
  - Total: 12.0 km^{2} (4.6 sq mi)
- Elevation: 294 m (965 ft)

Population (Dec. 2004)
  - Total: 660
  - Density: 55/km^{2} (140/sq mi)
- Demonym: Bastiesi
- Time zone: UTC+1 (CET)
  - Summer (DST): UTC+2 (CEST)
- Postal code: 12060
- Dialing code: 0174
- Website: Official website

Bastia Mondovì (Italian pronunciation: [baˈstiːa mondoˈvi]; Piedmontese: Bastìa) is a comune (municipality) in the Province of Cuneo in the Italian region Piedmont, located about 70 kilometres (43 mi) south of Turin and about 30 kilometres (19 mi) northeast of Cuneo.

Bastia Mondovì borders the following municipalities: Carrù, Cigliè, Clavesana, and Mondovì.

== Demographic evolution ==
Historical population

Year	Pop.	±%
1861	1,041	—
1871	1,116	+7.2%
1881	1,256	+12.5%
1901	1,434	+14.2%
1911	1,390	−3.1%

Year	Pop.	±%
1921	1,317	−5.3%
1931	1,212	−8.0%
1936	1,132	−6.6%
1951	1,021	−9.8%
1961	801	−21.5%

Year	Pop.	±%
1971	677	−15.5%
1981	623	−8.0%
1991	604	−3.0%
2001	624	+3.3%

Source: Data from ISTAT
