= Lisio =

- Comune
- Comune di Lisio
- Location within Italy Location within Piedmont
- Coordinates: 44°18′N 7°59′E
- Country: Italy
- Region: Piedmont
- Province: Province of Cuneo (CN)

Government
  - Mayor: Stefano Rossi

Area
  - Total: 8.6 km^{2} (3.3 sq mi)

Population (Dec. 2004)
  - Total: 237
  - Density: 28/km^{2} (71/sq mi)
- Time zone: UTC+1 (CET)
  - Summer (DST): UTC+2 (CEST)
- Postal code: 12070
- Dialing code: 0174

Lisio is a comune (municipality) in the Province of Cuneo in the Italian region Piedmont, located about 90 kilometres (56 mi) south of Turin and about 35 kilometres (22 mi) east of Cuneo. As of 31 December 2004, it had a population of 237 and an area of 8.6 square kilometres (3.3 mi^{2}).

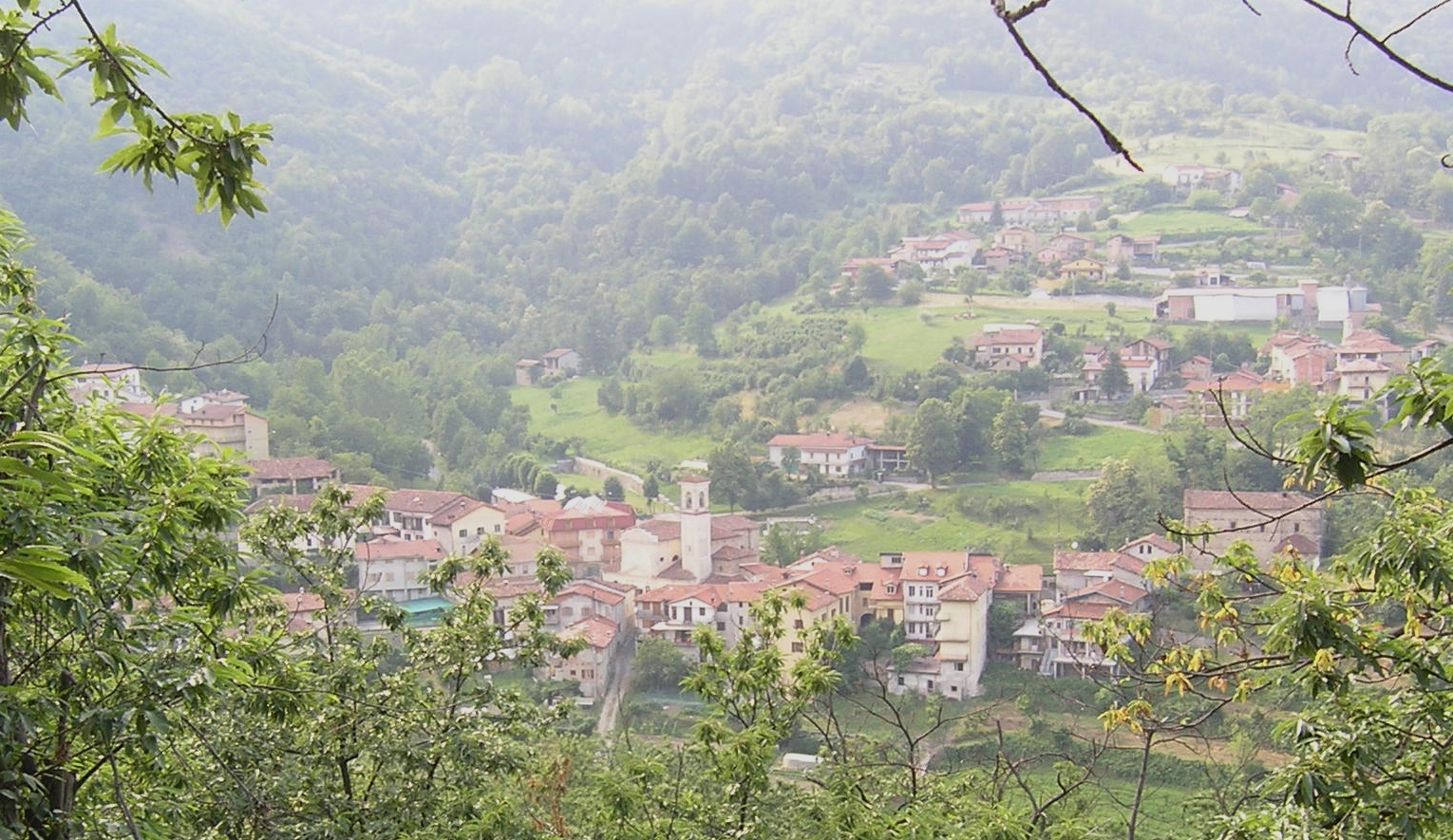
Lisio Piazza

Lisio borders the following municipalities: Bagnasco, Battifollo, Monasterolo Casotto, Scagnello, and Viola.

== Demographic evolution ==
Historical population

Year	Pop.	±%
1861	815	—
1871	757	−7.1%
1881	826	+9.1%
1901	736	−10.9%
1911	751	+2.0%

Year	Pop.	±%
1921	681	−9.3%
1931	643	−5.6%
1936	608	−5.4%
1951	599	−1.5%
1961	467	−22.0%

Year	Pop.	±%
1971	378	−19.1%
1981	332	−12.2%
1991	302	−9.0%
2001	248	−17.9%

Source: Data from ISTAT
