= Frabosa Soprana =

- Comune
- Comune di Frabosa Soprana
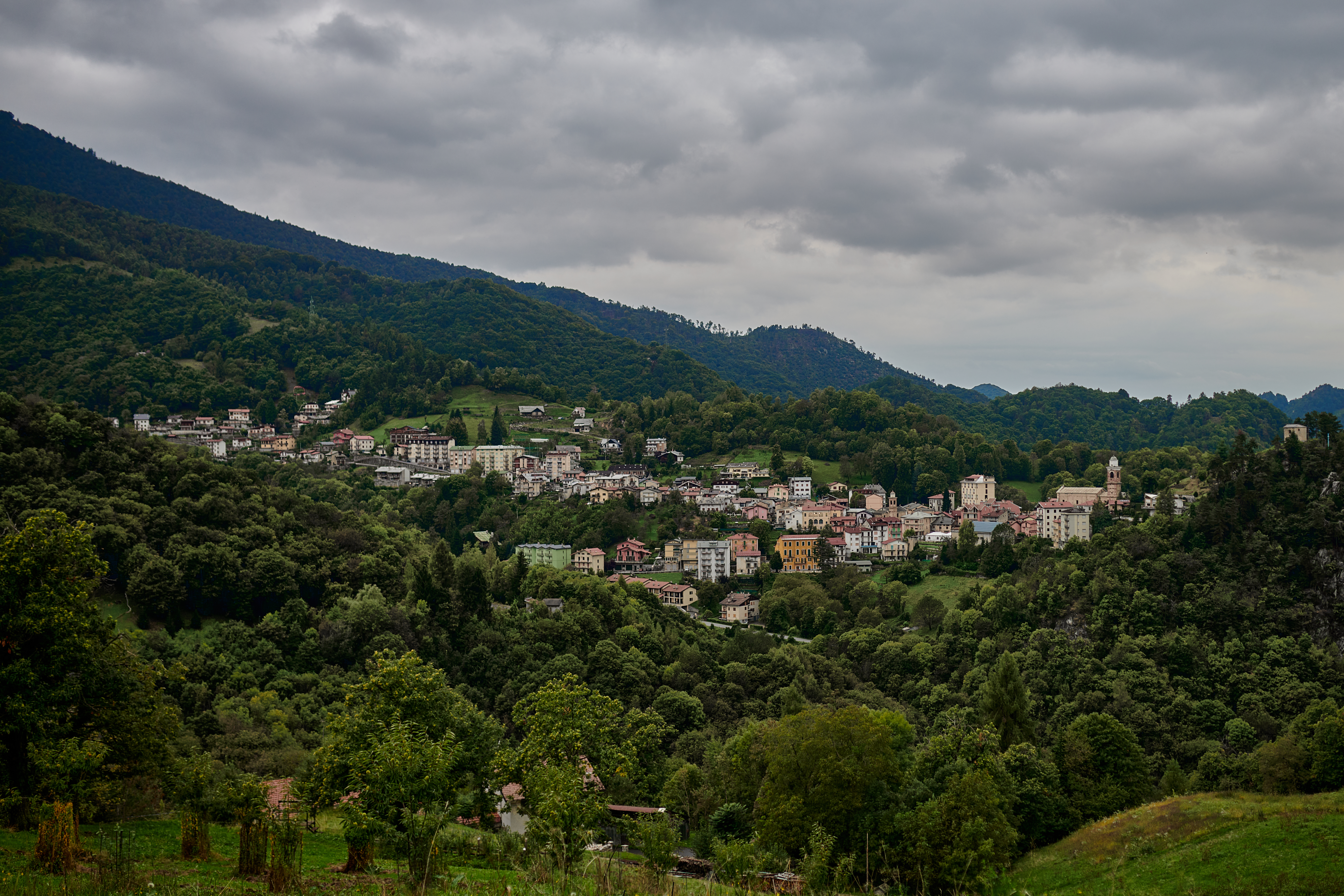

- Location within Italy Location within Piedmont
- Coordinates: 44°17′14.48″N 7°48′25.36″E
- Country: Italy
- Region: Piedmont
- Province: Cuneo (CN)
- Frazioni: Bossea, Straluzzo, Forneri, Mondagnola, Bassi, Lanza Serra, Seccata, Corsaglia, Fontane, Botteri, San Martino

Government
  - Mayor: Iole Caramello

Area
  - Total: 48.1 km^{2} (18.6 sq mi)
- Elevation: 891 m (2,923 ft)

Population (31 December 2011)
  - Total: 891
  - Density: 18.5/km^{2} (48.0/sq mi)
- Demonym: Frabosani
- Time zone: UTC+1 (CET)
  - Summer (DST): UTC+2 (CEST)
- Postal code: 12082
- Dialing code: 0174

Frabosa Soprana is a comune (municipality) in the Province of Cuneo in the Italian region Piedmont, located about 90 kilometres (56 mi) south of Turin and about 25 kilometres (16 mi) southeast of Cuneo.

Frabosa Soprana borders the following municipalities: Frabosa Sottana, Magliano Alpi, Monastero di Vasco, Montaldo di Mondovì, Ormea, and Roburent. The economy is based on winter tourism: it is connected through a chair lift to the Prato Nevoso ski resort.

Sights include the Caves of Bossea, a 2 km length karstic grottoes discovered in the 19th century, and the Monte Fantino.
