= Frabosa Sottana =

Frabosa Sottana Frabosa Sotana
- Comune
- Comune di Frabosa Sottana
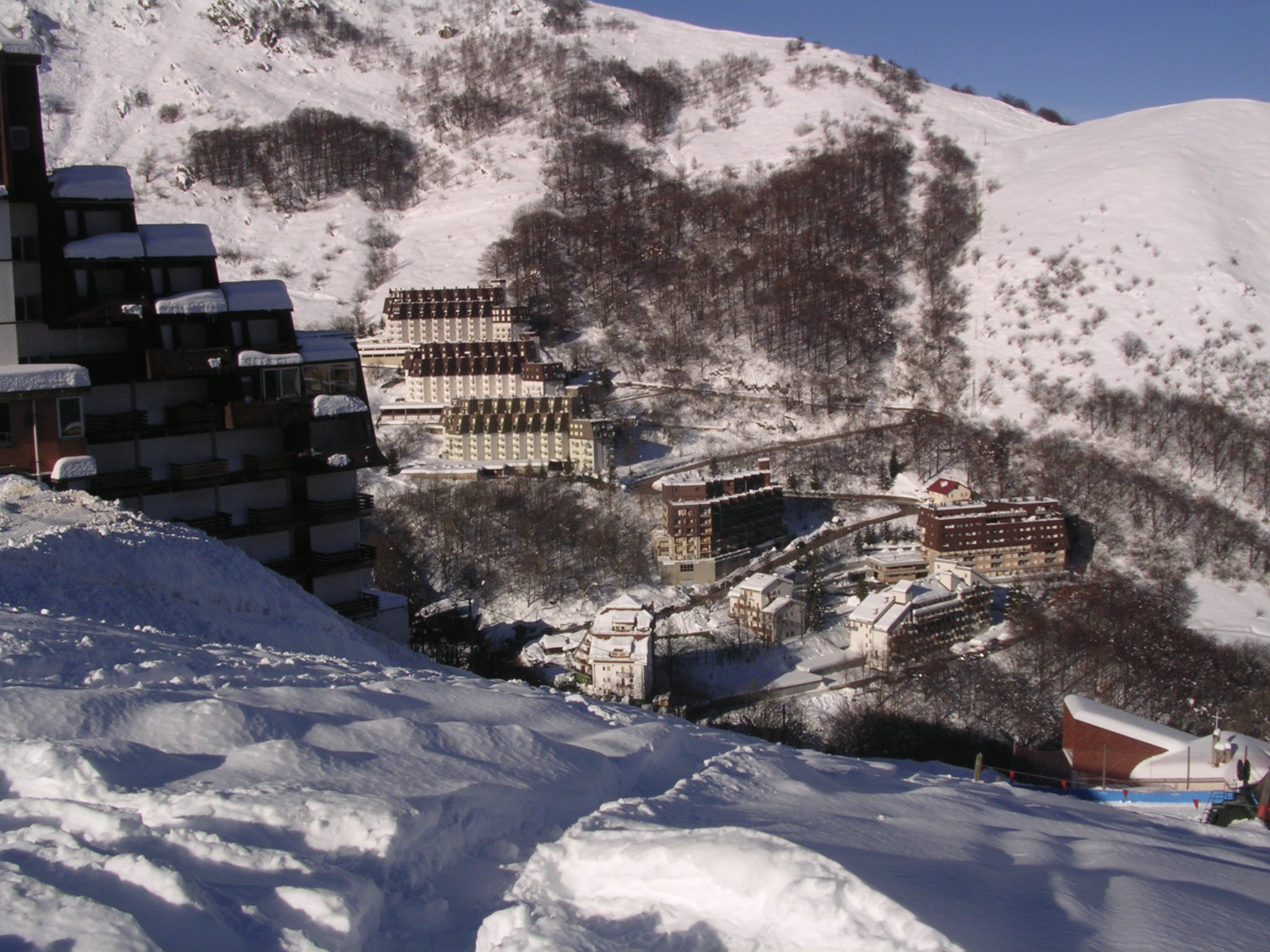
- View of the frazione of Artesina.

- Location within Italy Location within Piedmont
- Coordinates: 44°18′N 7°48′E
- Country: Italy
- Region: Piedmont
- Province: Cuneo (CN)
- Frazioni: Alma, Artesina, Gosi, Pianvignale, Prato Nevoso, Miroglio, Riosecco

Government
  - Mayor: Adriano Bertolino

Area
  - Total: 37.7 km^{2} (14.6 sq mi)
- Elevation: 641 m (2,103 ft)

Population (31 August 2017)
  - Total: 1,519
  - Density: 40.3/km^{2} (104/sq mi)
- Demonym: Frabosani
- Time zone: UTC+1 (CET)
  - Summer (DST): UTC+2 (CEST)
- Postal code: 12083
- Dialing code: 0174

Frabosa Sottana is a comune (municipality) in the Province of Cuneo in the Italian region Piedmont, located about 90 kilometres (56 mi) south of Turin and about 20 kilometres (12 mi) southeast of Cuneo. The economy is based on winter tourism, based on the nearby ski resort of Prato Nevoso.

Frabosa Sottana borders the following municipalities: Frabosa Soprana, Magliano Alpi, Monastero di Vasco, Roccaforte Mondovì, and Villanova Mondovì.

Frabosa Sottana is in the area of the Occitan language minority.
