= Mombasiglio =

- Comune
- Comune di Mombasiglio
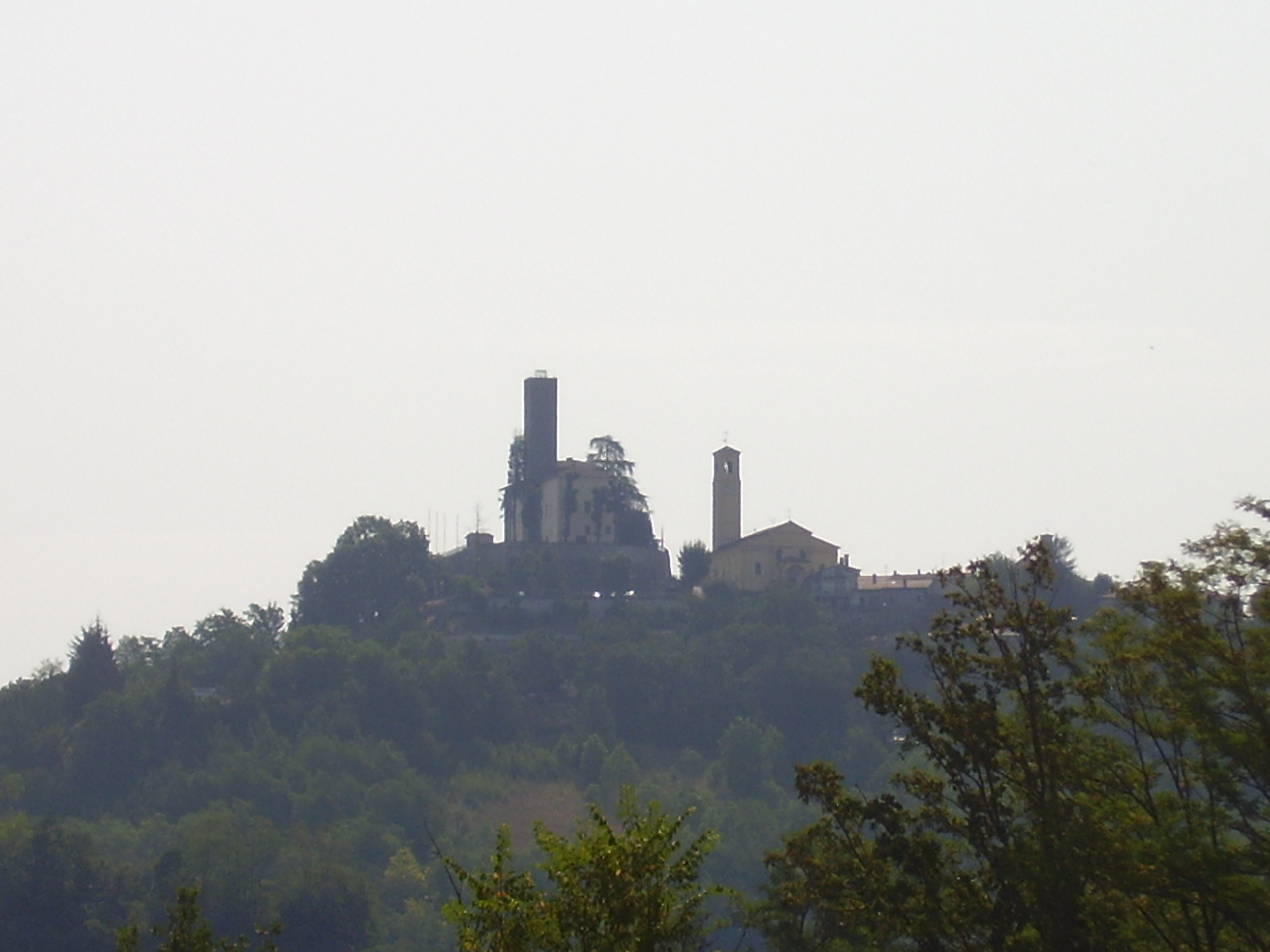
- The hill of Mombasiglio.

- Coat of arms

- Location within Italy Location within Piedmont
- Coordinates: 44°22′N 7°58′E
- Country: Italy
- Region: Piedmont
- Province: Province of Cuneo (CN)

Government
  - Mayor: Ivano Salvatico

Area
  - Total: 17.2 km^{2} (6.6 sq mi)

Population (31 May 2007)
  - Total: 604
  - Density: 35.1/km^{2} (91.0/sq mi)
- Time zone: UTC+1 (CET)
  - Summer (DST): UTC+2 (CEST)
- Postal code: 12070
- Dialing code: 0174

Mombasiglio is a comune (municipality) in the Province of Cuneo in the Italian region Piedmont, located about 80 kilometres (50 mi) southeast of Turin and about 35 kilometres (22 mi) east of Cuneo.
