= Bossolasco =

- Comune
- Comune di Bossolasco
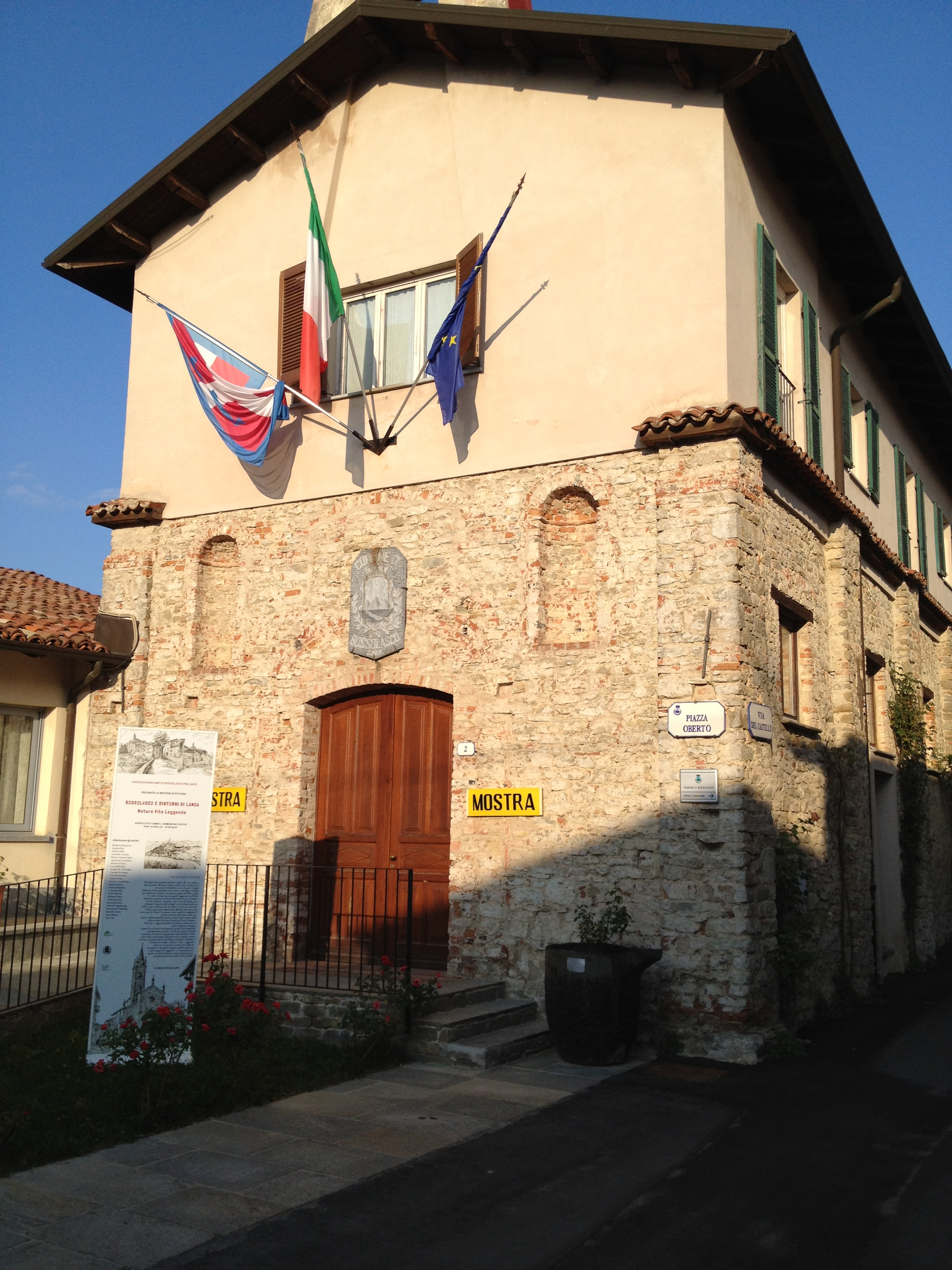
- Town hall

- Coat of arms

- Location within Italy Location within Piedmont
- Coordinates: 44°32′N 8°3′E
- Country: Italy
- Region: Piedmont
- Province: Cuneo (CN)

Government
  - Mayor: Luigi Manzone

Area
  - Total: 14.3 km^{2} (5.5 sq mi)
- Elevation: 757 m (2,484 ft)

Population (31 May 2007)
  - Total: 675
  - Density: 47.2/km^{2} (122/sq mi)
- Demonym: Bossolaschesi
- Time zone: UTC+1 (CET)
  - Summer (DST): UTC+2 (CEST)
- Postal code: 12060
- Dialing code: 0173

Bossolasco is a comune (municipality) in the Province of Cuneo in the Italian region Piedmont, located about 70 kilometres (43 mi) southeast of Turin and about 45 kilometres (28 mi) northeast of Cuneo.

== Main sights ==
- Balestrino Castle
- Del Carretto Castle (14th century)
