= Marsaglia =

- Comune
- Comune di Marsaglia
- Coat of arms

- Location within Italy Location within Piedmont
- Coordinates: 44°27′N 7°58′E
- Country: Italy
- Region: Piedmont
- Province: Cuneo (CN)

Government
  - Mayor: Franca Biglio

Area
  - Total: 13.0 km^{2} (5.0 sq mi)
- Elevation: 607 m (1,991 ft)

Population (2007)
  - Total: 294
  - Density: 22.6/km^{2} (58.6/sq mi)
- Demonym: Marsagliesi
- Time zone: UTC+1 (CET)
  - Summer (DST): UTC+2 (CEST)
- Postal code: 12060
- Dialing code: 0174
- Website: Official website

Marsaglia is a comune (municipality) in the Province of Cuneo in the Italian region Piedmont, located about 70 kilometres (43 mi) southeast of Turin and about 35 kilometres (22 mi) east of Cuneo.
