= Vicoforte =

- Comune
- Comune di Vicoforte
- The Sanctuary Basilica of Vicoforte.

- Coat of arms

- Location within Italy Location within Piedmont
- Coordinates: 44°22′N 7°51′E
- Country: Italy
- Region: Piedmont
- Province: Cuneo (CN)
- Frazioni: Fiamenga, Moline, San Grato, Santuario, Vico

Government
  - Mayor: Gian Pietro Gasco

Area
  - Total: 25 km^{2} (9.7 sq mi)
- Elevation: 547 m (1,795 ft)

Population (31 December 2016)
  - Total: 3,153
  - Density: 130/km^{2} (330/sq mi)
- Demonym: Vicesi
- Time zone: UTC+1 (CET)
  - Summer (DST): UTC+2 (CEST)
- Postal code: 12080
- Dialing code: 0174
- Patron saint: Saint Theobald
- Saint day: 1 June
- Website: Official website

Vicoforte is a comune in the Province of Cuneo in Italy. It is located in Val Corsaglia at 547 metres (1,795 ft) above sea level, 32 kilometres (20 mi) east of Cuneo and 6 kilometres (3.7 mi) from Mondovì.

It is known mainly for the Santuario di Vicoforte, built between 1596 and 1733 to honour the Virgin Mary.
