= Bionda Piemontese =

Italian breed of chicken

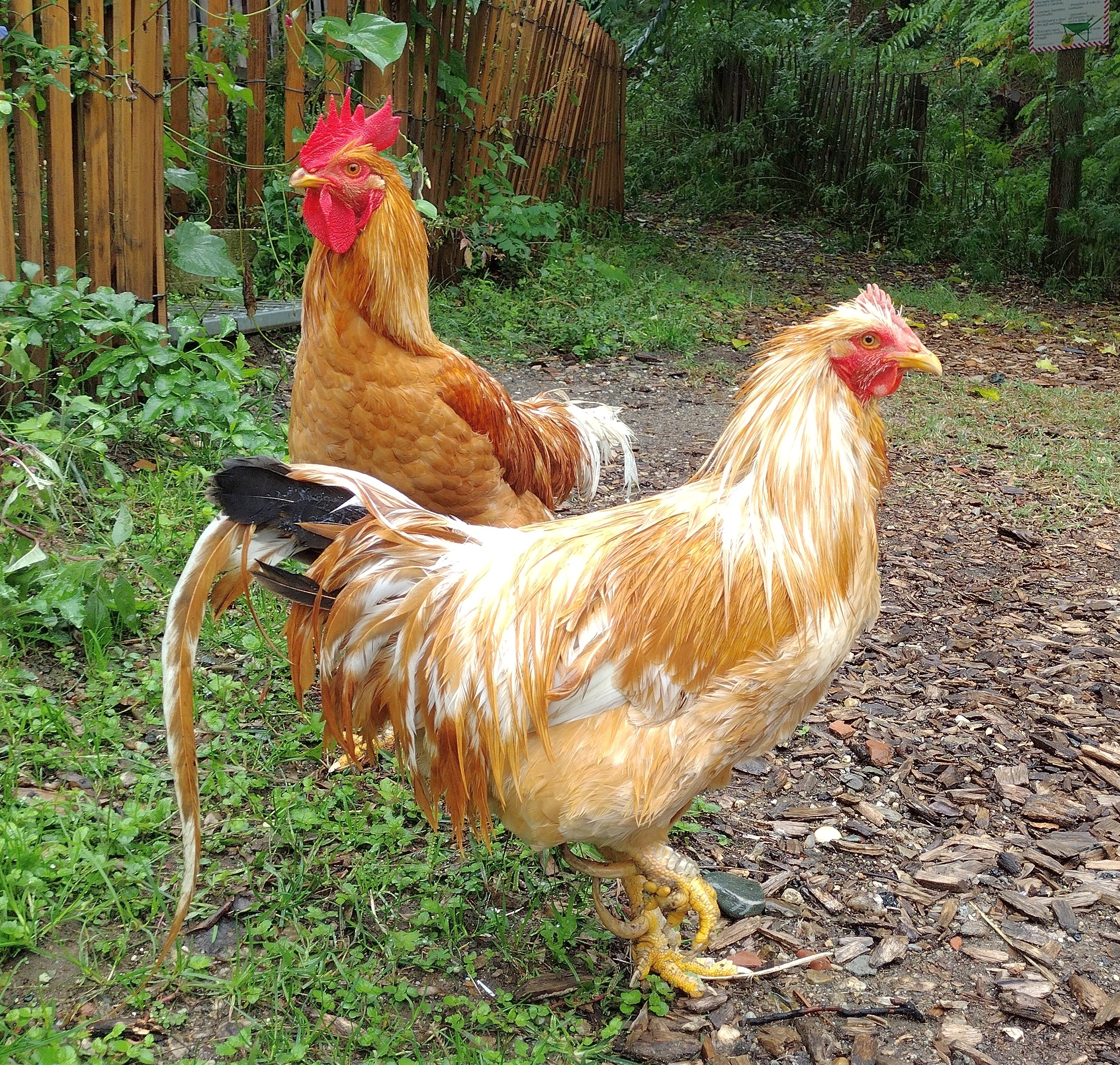
- A cock and a capon
- Conservation status: FAO (2007): not listed; DAD-IS (2025): at risk/endangered
- Other names: Bionda di Cuneo; Bionda di Villanova; Rossa delle Crivelle; Nostralina
- Country of origin: Italy
- Use: dual-purpose breed

Traits
- Weight: Male: 2.5–2.8 kg (5.5–6 lb); Female: 2.0–2.3 kg (4.5–5 lb)
- Skin colour: yellow
- Egg colour: pinkish brown
- Comb type: single

Classification
- Chicken; Gallus gallus domesticus

The Bionda Piemontese is a traditional Italian dual-purpose breed of chicken. It originates in the Piemonte region of north-western Italy, from which it takes its name. It may also be called the Bionda di Cuneo, after the comune of Cuneo or the surrounding province; the Bionda di Villanova, after the comune of Villanova d'Asti in the province of Asti; the Rossa delle Crivelle, after a village near Buttigliera d'Asti; or the Nostralina.

== History ==
The Bionda Piemontese was once widely distributed in Piemonte. In the 1960s, industrialisation and intensive agriculture caused a decline in the breed, which is suitable only for free-range management. Recovery began in 1999 under the auspices of the Istituto Professionale per l'Agricoltura e l'Ambiente (Professional Institute for Agriculture and the Environment) of Verzuolo, in the province of Cuneo. A breed standard was approved by the Federazione Italiana Associazioni Avicole, the federation of Italian poultry associations, in May 2007, based in part on a description of the breed by Vittorino Vezzani in an article published in 1938.

The breed's numbers remain low. A study published in 2007 used a figure of approximately 1400 for the total breeding stock, of which approximately 400 were cocks.

== Characteristics ==
The Bionda Piemontese is buff, with either a black or a blue tail. It has yellow skin and legs; the ear-lobes vary from yellow to creamy white. The comb is single and large, with 4–6 points. Average weight is 2.5–2.8 kg for cocks, 2.0–2.3 kg for hens.

The eggs are pinkish brown and weigh 55–60 g. Ring size is 18 mm for cocks, 16 mm for hens.

== Uses ==
It is a dual-purpose breed. Hens lay 180–200 eggs per year.

It grows fast. In meat production, birds may reach their final weight at about 16 weeks, or be slaughtered at about 10 weeks at a weight of 1.5 kg.

It is used in the production of the Cappone di Morozzo, or capon of Morozzo, a traditional agricultural product raised under strict conditions in the comuni of Morozzo, Margarita, Castelletto Stura, Montanera, Sant'Albano Stura, Trinità, Magliano Alpi, Rocca de' Baldi, Mondovì, Villanova Mondovì, Pianfei, Beinette and Cuneo. Capons are slaughtered at no less than 220 days, and weigh 2.0–2.7 kg. The combs and wattles removed during caponisation, at about 10 weeks, are an essential ingredient of the traditional Piedmontese dish la Finanziera.
