= Lake Pianfei =

Artificial lake in Piedmont, Italy

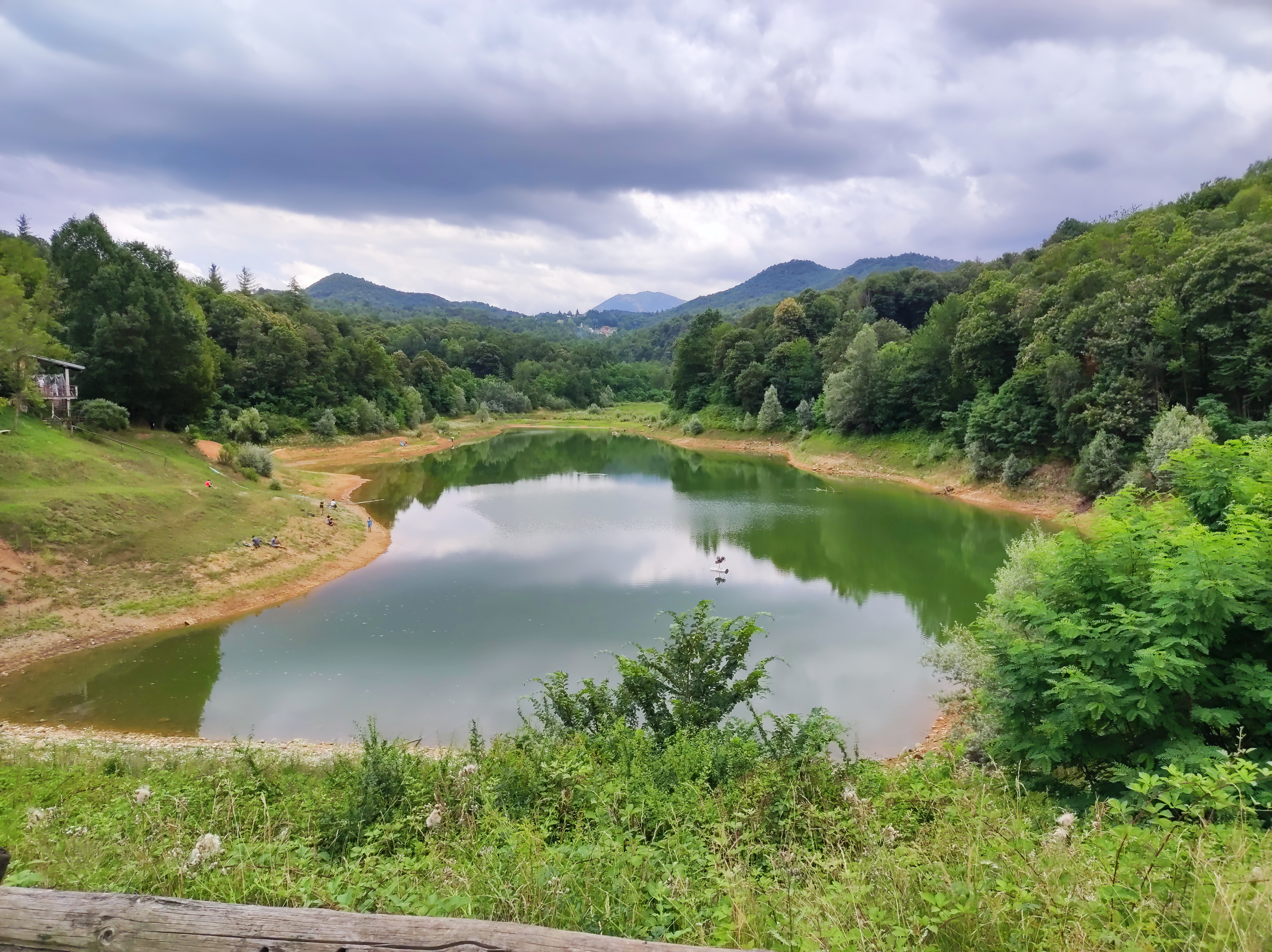
- The lake in June 2022
- Interactive map of Lake Pianfei
- Location: Chiusa Pesio, Pianfei, Province of Cuneo, Piedmont, Italy
- Coordinates: 44.34645°N 7.71006°E
- Type: Artificial lake
- Primary inflows: Various
- Primary outflows: Rio Bealerotto
- Water volume: 0.00055 km^{3} (0.00013 cu mi)
- Islands: None

The Lake Pianfei is an artificial lake located in the Province of Cuneo.

== Description ==
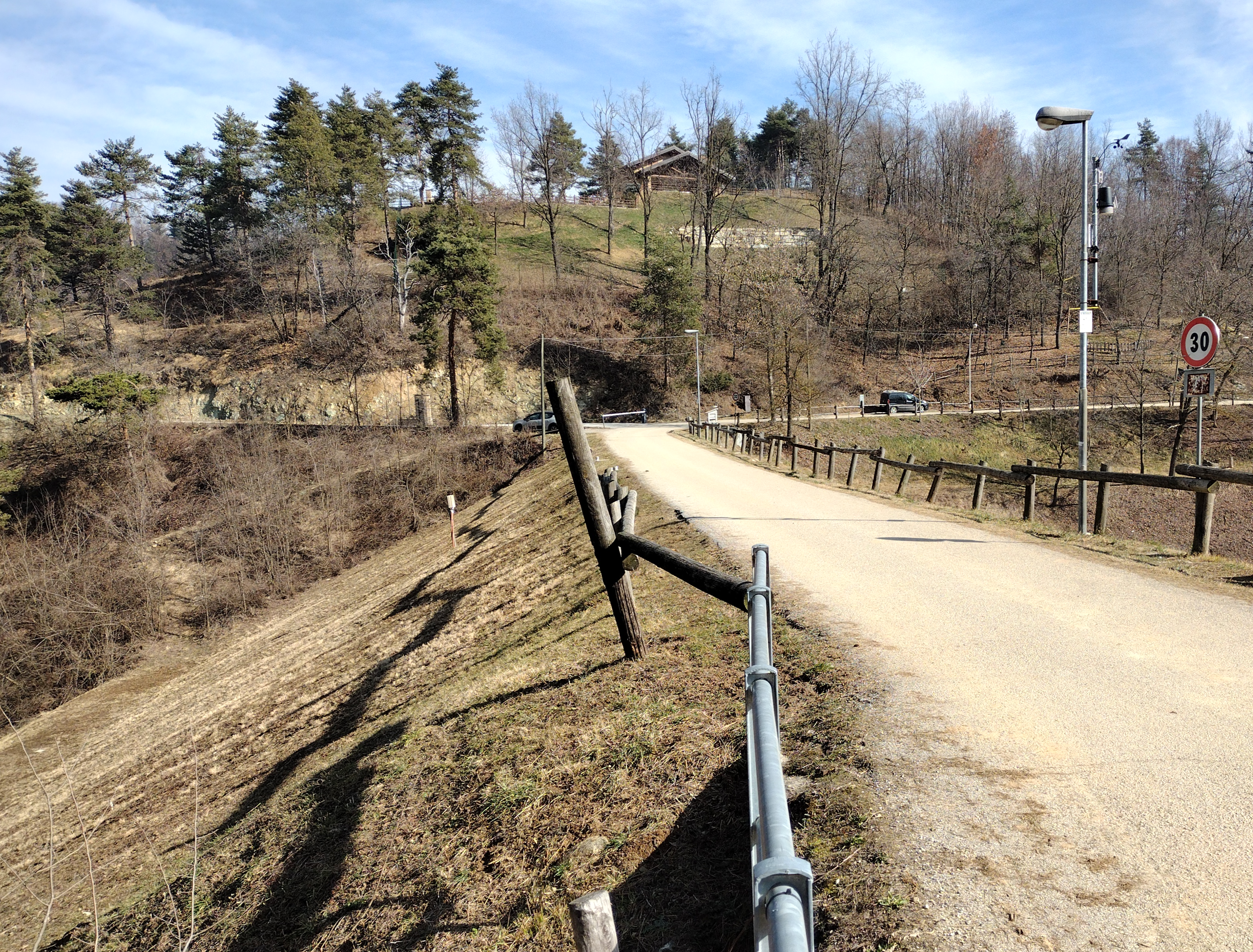
The dam: upstream face

The small reservoir is almost entirely within the municipal territory of Chiusa Pesio, at the border with the municipality of Pianfei, in the northernmost part of the Ligurian Alps. The area of its drainage basin includes rocks of various types, among which are calcschists and serpentinites.

The area of the drainage basin subtended by the dam is 1.21 km². The maximum capacity of the reservoir is 550,000 cubic meters. The impoundment was achieved with a dam of the homogeneous earth type, and it is 20.50 meters high.

== History ==
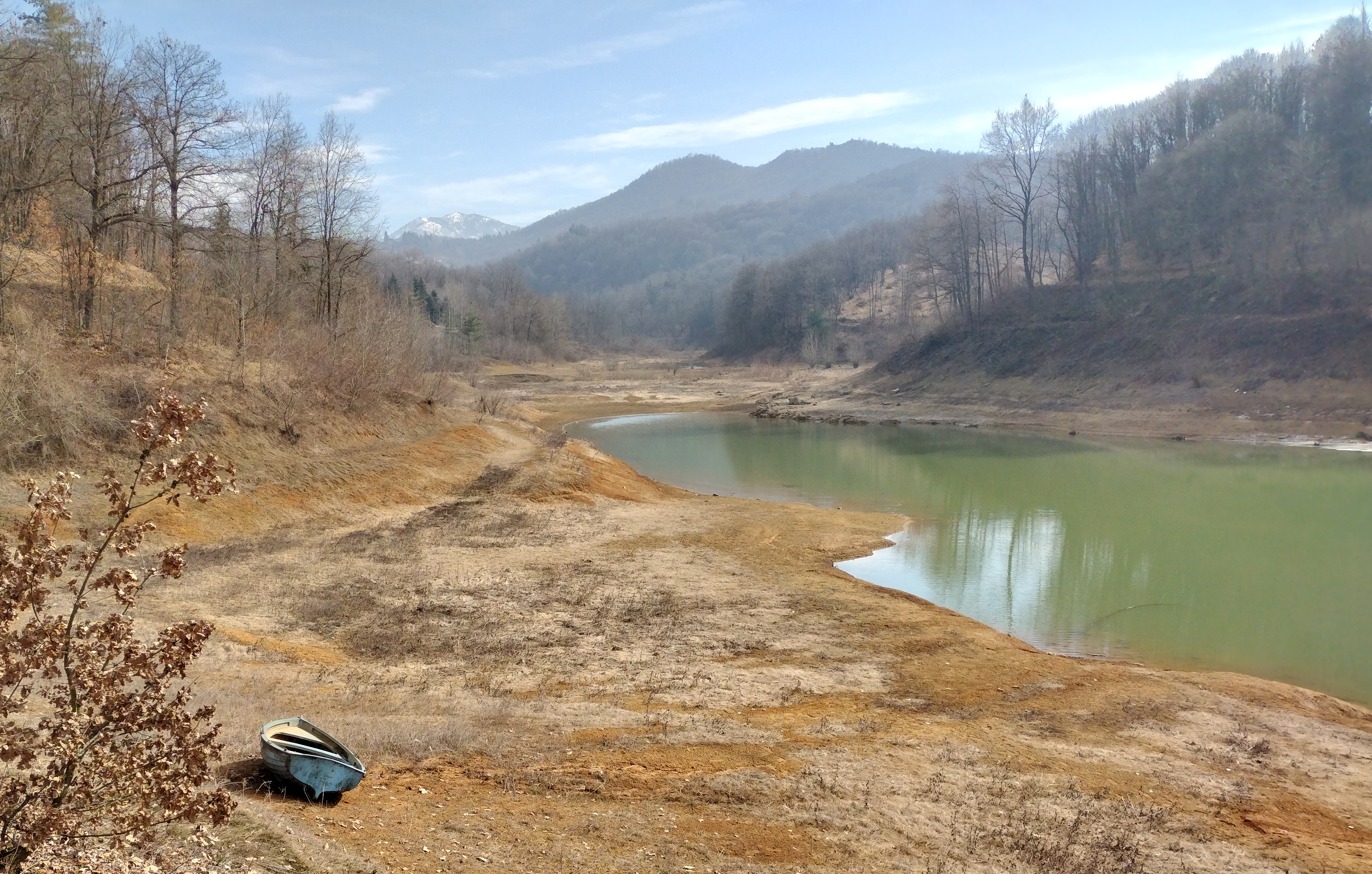
The lake in February 2023

The reservoir was created in 1963 for irrigation purposes. Construction work was completed in 1964. The basin is managed by the Consorzio Irriguo Bealerotto Mussi, established in 1961. In 2021, activities began for a major project to extend the Monregalese water network, which also involves Lake Pianfei.

== Uses ==
=== Sport fishing ===
The reservoir is included in the fishing reserve of the Italian Federation of Sport Fishing and Underwater Activities called “Lake Pianfei”. Among the fish present in the lake are the carp, the pike, the sturgeon, the brown trout, and the rainbow trout. Fishing is open from mid-March to mid-December.

=== Hiking and MTB ===
The lake is also a destination for walkers and bikers, who can follow the natural surface path surrounding the reservoir or explore the extensive network of trails in the area. The area is also frequented for horseback riding excursions.

== Bibliography ==
- AA.VV.; Camera di Commercio di Cuneo (2013). Alps Benchmarking - Benchmarking Report 2013 [Alps Benchmarking - Benchmarking Report 2013] (PDF) (in Italian). Camera di Commercio di Cuneo. ISBN 978-88-907239-8-8.

=== Cartography ===
- Cartografia ufficiale italiana in scala 1:25.000 e 1:100.000 [Official Italian cartography at scales 1:25,000 and 1:100,000] (in Italian). Istituto Geografico Militare.
- Carta dei sentieri e stradale scala 1:25.000 n. 22 Mondovì Val Ellero Val Maudagna Val Corsaglia Val Casotto [Trail and road map scale 1:25,000 no. 22 Mondovì Val Ellero Val Maudagna Val Corsaglia Val Casotto] (in Italian). Ciriè: Fraternali editore.
- Carta in scala 1:50.000 n. 8 Alpi Marittime e Liguri [Map at scale 1:50,000 no. 8 Maritime and Ligurian Alps] (in Italian). Torino: Istituto Geografico Centrale.
