= Monte Cavanero =

Mountain in Piedmont, Italy

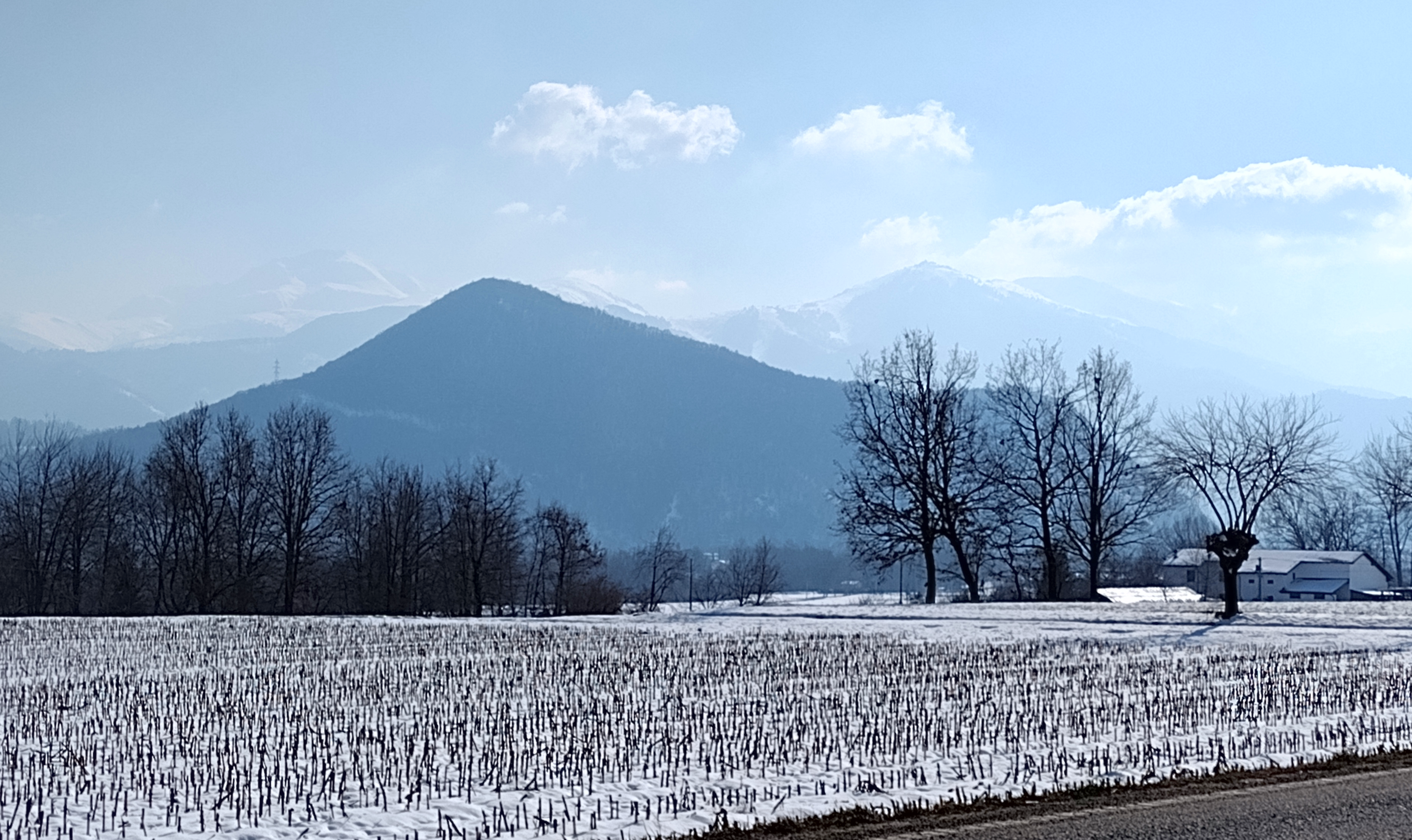
- The mountain as seen from the Po plain

Highest point
- Elevation: 854 m (2,802 ft)
- Prominence: 153 m (502 ft)
- Isolation: 6.95 km (4.32 mi)
- Coordinates: 44°19′22″N 7°41′27″E

Geography
- Location within Italy
- Location: Piedmont, Cuneo, Italy
- Parent range: Ligurian Alps

Monte Cavanero is a mountain in the Ligurian Alps that reaches an elevation of 854 metres (2,802 ft).

== Etymology ==
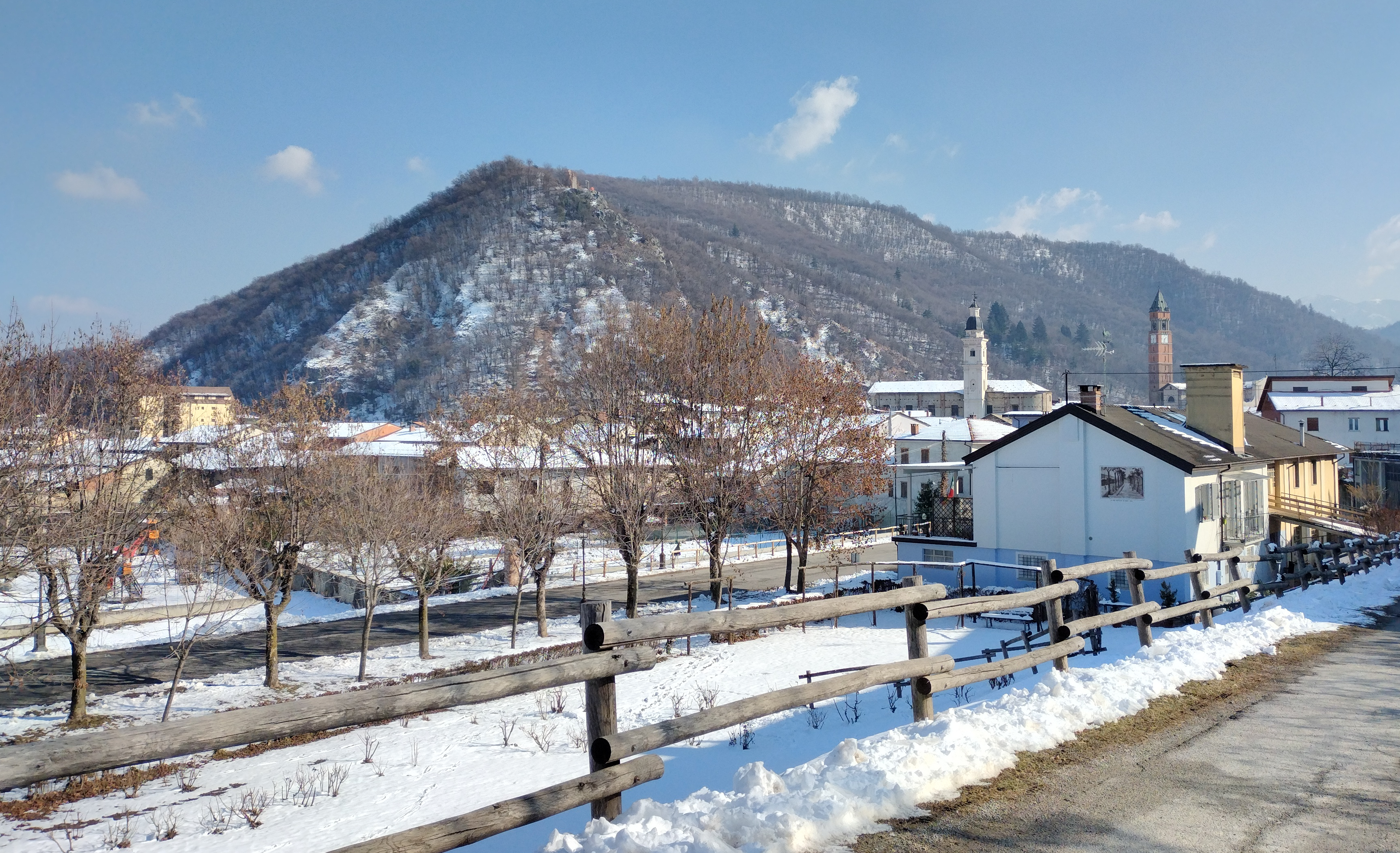
View from Chiusa di Pesio

The mountain's name may derive from the Latin Mons Capanerium, or Mount of the Huts, perhaps in turn related to a pre-Celtic toponym that also referred to the presence of a protohistoric settlement.

== Geography ==
The mountain lies on the right side of the Pesio river, at the outlet of its valley onto the plain, and overlooks the village of Chiusa di Pesio to the east. A coastline of wooded relief connects it eastward to the Bric Barelllo and Costa Neranotte, while to the southeast the Colle del Mortè (711 m) connects this wide semicircle of low mountains with the rest of the Marguareis Alps. Its topographic prominence is 15m.

== Geology ==
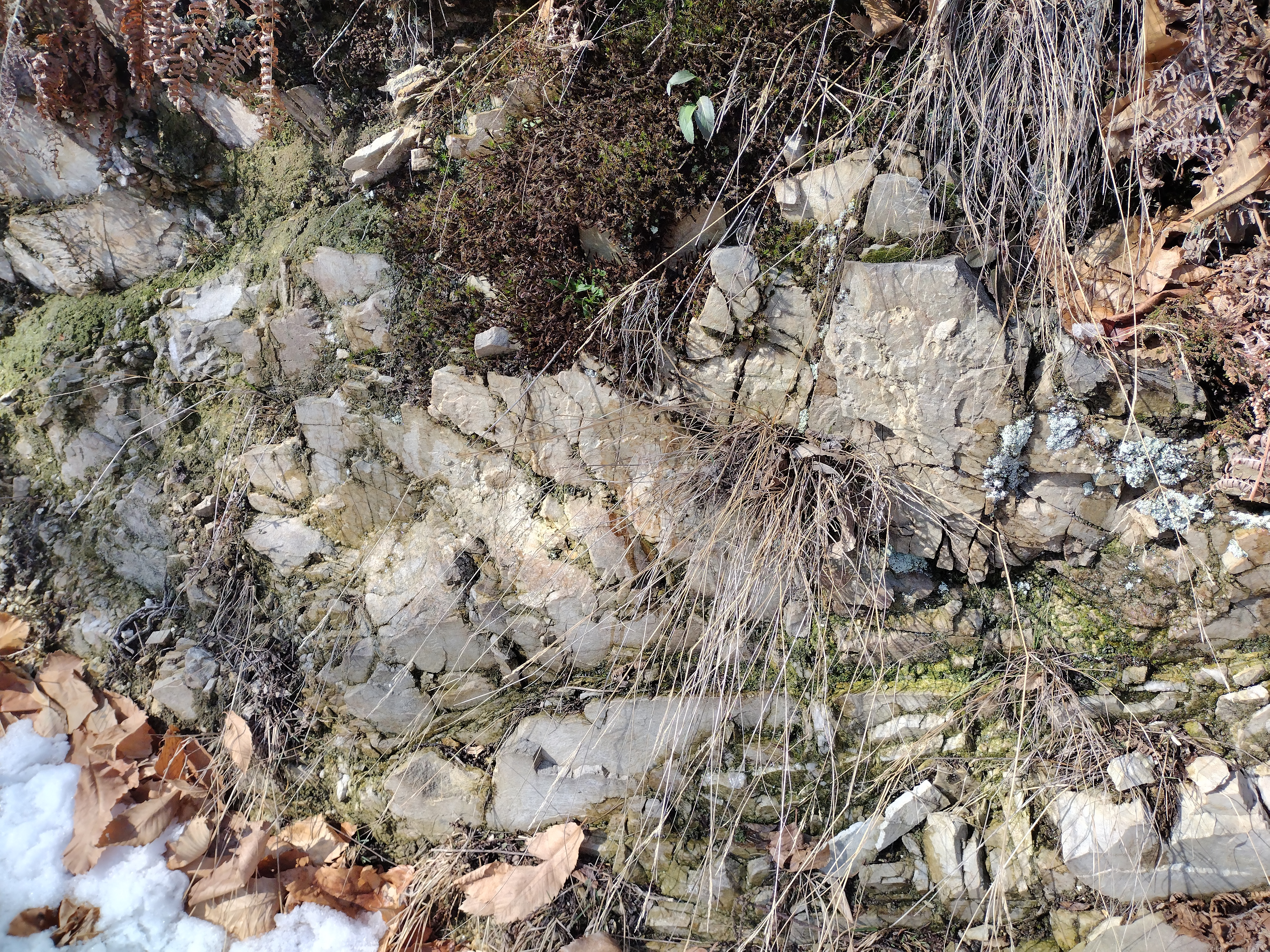
Outcrop of schistose rocks on the western slope of the mountain

The mountain is characterized by schistose rocks of Triassic origin, structurally related to the reliefs located west of Villanova Mondovì, such as Mount Calvario and Costa Neranotte.

== History ==
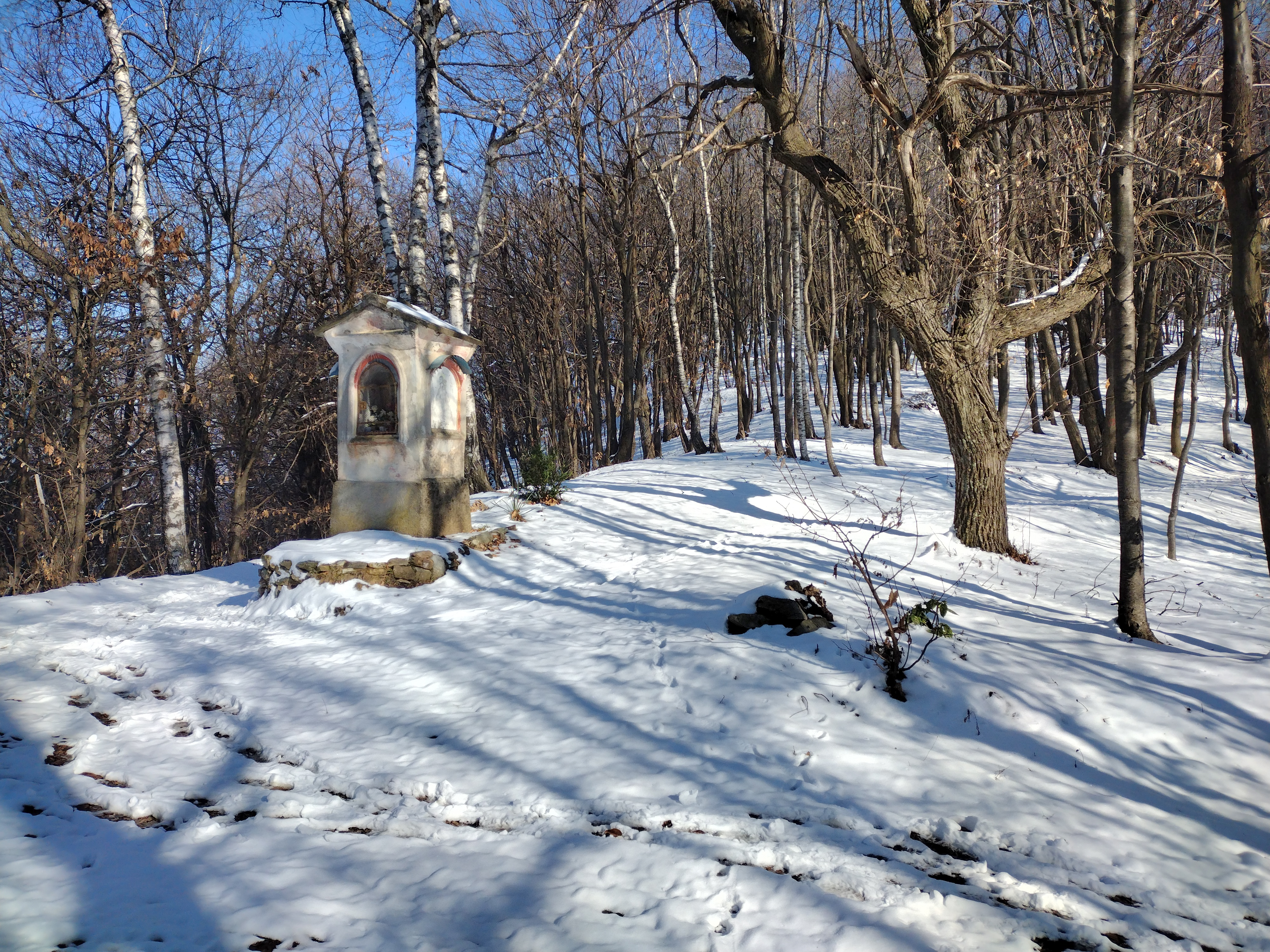
Wayside shrine just upstream of the castle

On a secondary relief of Mount Cavanero, overlooking the village of Chiusa Pesio, stands Mirabello Castle. An early medieval fortified building was built by reusing materials from an earlier Roman fortification located a little further upstream. After the mid-16th century the pre-existing structures were dismantled by Agamemnon III, lord of Chiusa, to build a more modern castle. Only a few ruins remain of the castle today, following damage from abandonment and an earthquake on 23 February 1887.

The area was inhabited even before Roman times, and a necropolis used between the 11th and 9th centuries B.C. was found on the mountain, that is, between the Bronze Age and the early Iron Age period. To the Iron Age presumably also date back the Monte Cavanero Bronzes, a series of 319 objects discovered in 1991 in the so-called Cavanero hoard and now preserved in the "Cav. G. Avena" Museum Complex in Chiusa Pesio. The artifacts, which are of considerable archaeological importance, have also been temporarily exhibited abroad.

== Access to the summit ==
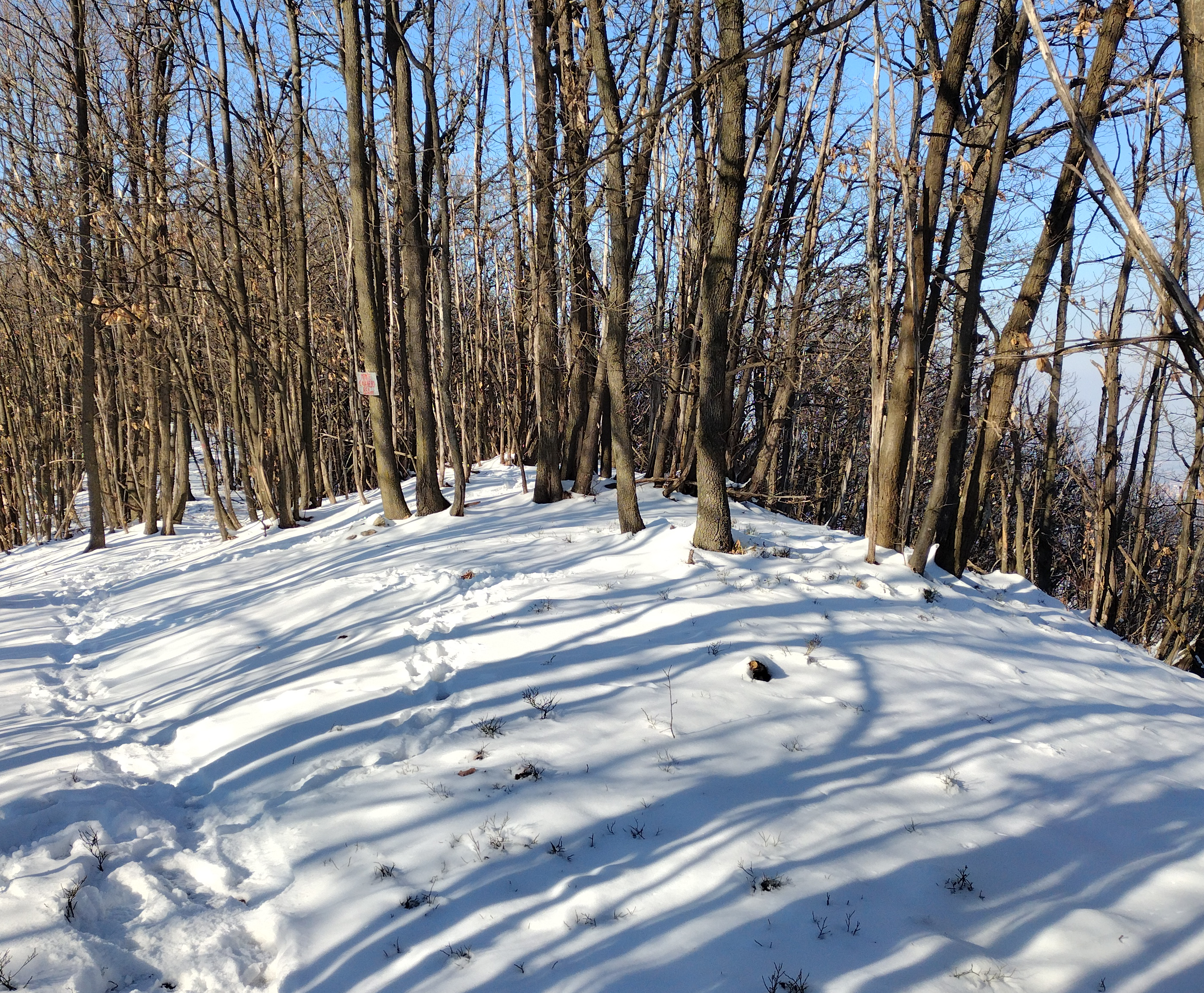
The top of the mountain

The summit of Mount Cavanero can be easily reached on foot, in about an hour's walk, passing near Mirabello Castle. The start of the hike can be made after parking the car beside the road that connects the center of Chiusa with the Mortè hill.

== See also ==
- Chiusa di Pesio
- Pesio
- Mirabello Castle (Piedmont)

== Bibliography ==
- Marazzi, Sergio (2005). Atlante Orografico delle Alpi. SOIUSA. Pavone Canavese (TO): Priuli & Verlucca. ISBN 9788880682738.
- Cartografia ufficiale italiana in scala 1:25.000 e 1:100.000. Istituto Geografico Militare.
- Carta dei sentieri e stradale scala 1:25.000 n. 16 Val Vermenagna Valle Pesio Alta val Ellero Parco naturale del Marguareis. Ciriè: Fraternali editore.
- Carta in scala 1:50.000 n. 8 Alpi Marittime e Liguri. Turin: Istituto Geografico Centrale.
