= Margarita, Piedmont =

Margarita
- Comune
- Comune di Margarita
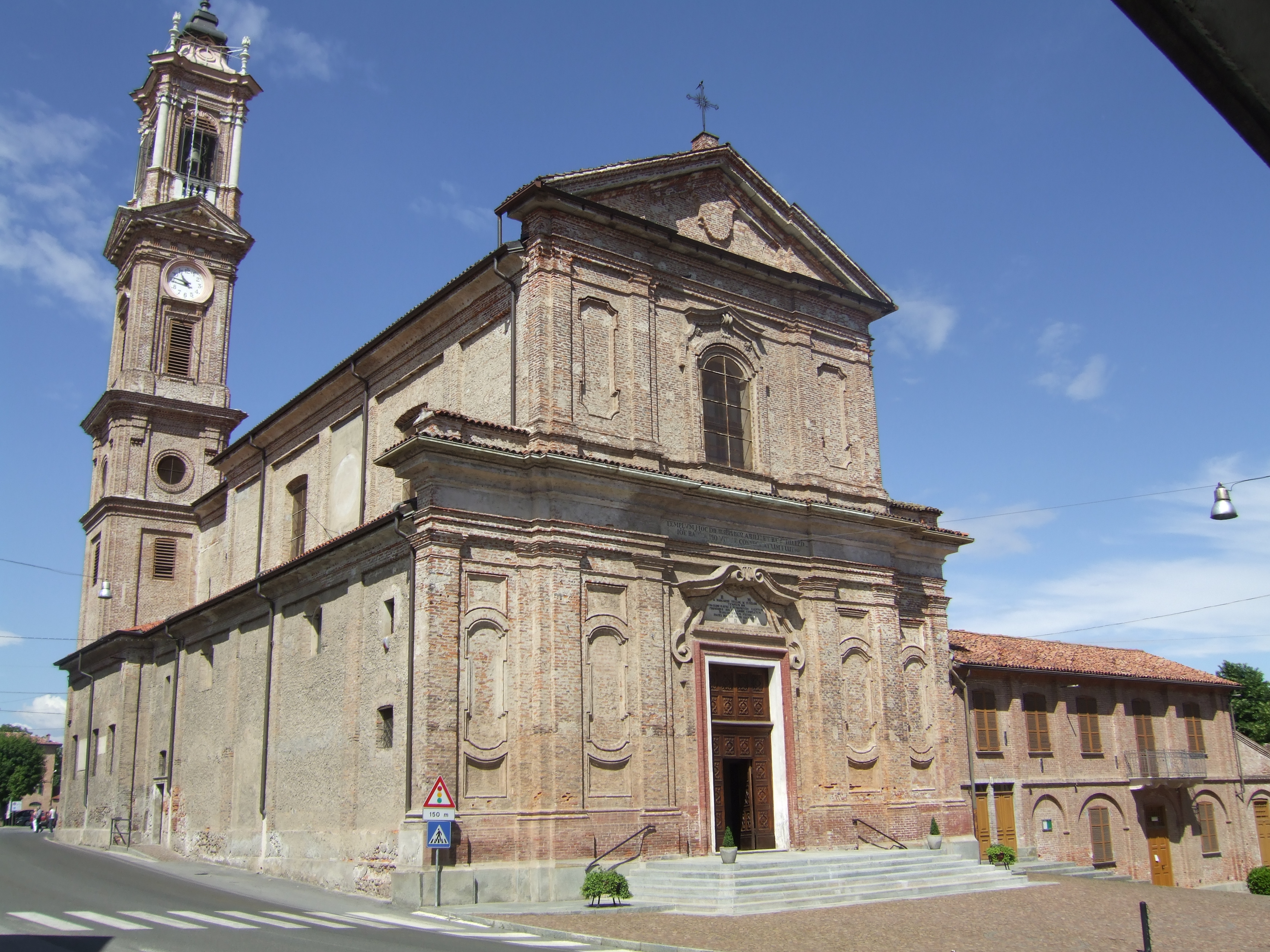
- Parish church.

- Coat of arms

- Location within Italy Location within Piedmont
- Coordinates: 44°24′N 7°41′E
- Country: Italy
- Region: Piedmont
- Province: Cuneo (CN)

Government
  - Mayor: Michele Alberti

Area
  - Total: 11.38 km^{2} (4.39 sq mi)
- Elevation: 448 m (1,470 ft)

Population (30 September 2017)
  - Total: 1,420
  - Density: 125/km^{2} (323/sq mi)
- Demonym: Margaritesi
- Time zone: UTC+1 (CET)
  - Summer (DST): UTC+2 (CEST)
- Postal code: 12040
- Dialing code: 0171
- Website: Official website

Margarita is a comune (municipality) in the Province of Cuneo in the Italian region Piedmont, located about 70 kilometres (43 mi) south of Turin and about 11 kilometres (7 mi) east of Cuneo.

Margarita borders the following municipalities: Beinette, Chiusa di Pesio, Mondovì, Morozzo, and Pianfei.
