= Miglio =

Miglio is a surname. Notable people with the surname include:

- Arrigo Miglio (born 1942), Italian Roman Catholic archbishop
- Gianfranco Miglio (1918–2001), Italian jurist, political scientist and politician
- Pietro Miglio (1910–1992), Italian footballer

== See also ==
- Mile § Italian mile
