= Beinette =

- Comune
- Comune di Beinette
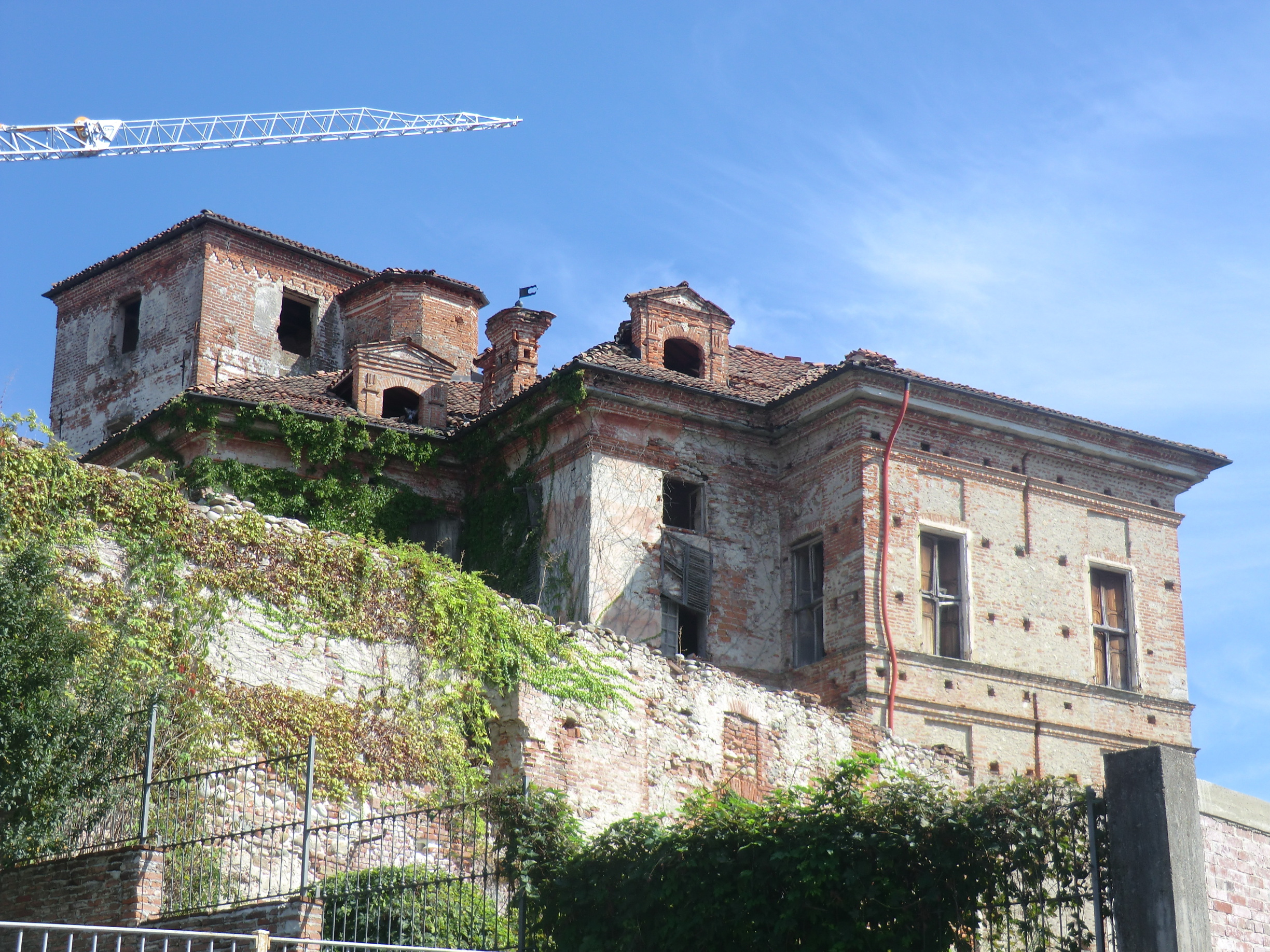
- Beinette castle

- Location within Italy Location within Piedmont
- Coordinates: 44°22′N 7°39′E
- Country: Italy
- Region: Piedmont
- Province: Province of Cuneo (CN)

Area
  - Total: 17.4 km^{2} (6.7 sq mi)

Population (Dec. 2004)
  - Total: 2,898
  - Density: 167/km^{2} (431/sq mi)
- Time zone: UTC+1 (CET)
  - Summer (DST): UTC+2 (CEST)
- Postal code: 12081
- Dialing code: 0171

Beinette is a comune (municipality) in the Province of Cuneo in the Italian region Piedmont, located about 80 kilometres (50 mi) south of Turin and about 8 kilometres (5 mi) east of Cuneo. As of 31 December 2004, it had a population of 2,898 and an area of 17.4 square kilometres (6.7 mi^{2}).

Beinette borders the following municipalities: Chiusa di Pesio, Cuneo, Margarita, Morozzo, and Peveragno.

== Demographic evolution ==
Historical population

Year	Pop.	±%
1861	1,726	—
1871	1,802	+4.4%
1881	1,976	+9.7%
1901	1,659	−16.0%
1911	1,868	+12.6%

Year	Pop.	±%
1921	1,848	−1.1%
1931	1,846	−0.1%
1936	1,731	−6.2%
1951	1,839	+6.2%
1961	1,859	+1.1%

Year	Pop.	±%
1971	1,950	+4.9%
1981	2,626	+34.7%
1991	2,656	+1.1%
2001	2,719	+2.4%

Source: Data from ISTAT
