= Pianfei =

- Comune
- Comune di Pianfei
- Coat of arms

- Location within Italy Location within Piedmont
- Coordinates: 44°22′N 7°42′E
- Country: Italy
- Region: Piedmont
- Province: Cuneo (CN)
- Frazioni: Ambrosi, Bassa, Blangetti, Gariè, Mussi, Prato Salice, Ressia, Revelli, Viglioni

Government
  - Mayor: Marco Turco

Area
  - Total: 15.1 km^{2} (5.8 sq mi)
- Elevation: 500 m (1,600 ft)

Population (31 July 2010)
  - Total: 2,185
  - Density: 145/km^{2} (375/sq mi)
- Demonym: Pianfeiesi
- Time zone: UTC+1 (CET)
  - Summer (DST): UTC+2 (CEST)
- Postal code: 12080
- Dialing code: 0174
- Website: Official website

Pianfei is a comune (municipality) in the Province of Cuneo in the Italian region Piedmont, located about 80 kilometres (50 mi) south of Turin and about 13 kilometres (8 mi) east of Cuneo.

Pianfei borders the following municipalities: Chiusa di Pesio, Margarita, Mondovì, Roccaforte Mondovì, and Villanova Mondovì.
