= Nete Twins =

Twins Nete
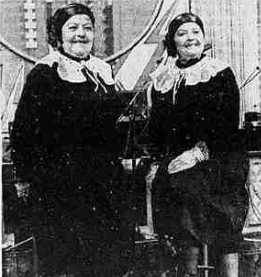

Background information
- Origin: Italy, Region of Piemonte
- Genres: Italian popular music
- Years active: 1940–1995
- Members: Neta Costamagna; Kina Costamagna

Twins Nete (in Italian Le Gemelle Nete) was an Italian musical group founded by the sisters Neta and Kina Costamagna in 1940.

== Career ==
Anna (Neta) and Domenica (Kina) Costamagna were born in 1911 in Trinità, province of Cuneo, Italy. They started to work as tailors: Neta with shirts and China with embroidery.

In the 1940s they began, as autodidacts, to study music: Neta with the guitar and China with the mandolin. For more than 40 years they sang italian popular music: sweet and popular pieces of the workers or of the Italian economic miracle.

Kina died in 1990, but Neta continued to sing solo, or with other popular groups. In 2001, for the 90th birthday of China an artistic book about their work was published, with compliments by Renzo Arbore, Aldo Grasso, Michele Serra and many others. Neta died in 2002.

From the summer of 2011, the Municipality of Trinità has organised, every 2–3 years, the Nete Pride, in collaboration with popular Italian groups.

== Discography ==
Some of their most known songs are:

- Amor di pastorello
- Balocchi e profumi
- Canti nuovi
- Creola
- Donna
- La piccola fioraia
- Ladra
- Meglio sarebbe
- Miniera
- Nina panca
- Sogni d'oro
- Stornelli campagnoli
- Tic e tic, tac e tac (Gira, rigira biondina)
- Un bacio a mezzanotte
