= Trinità =

- Comune
- Comune di Trinità
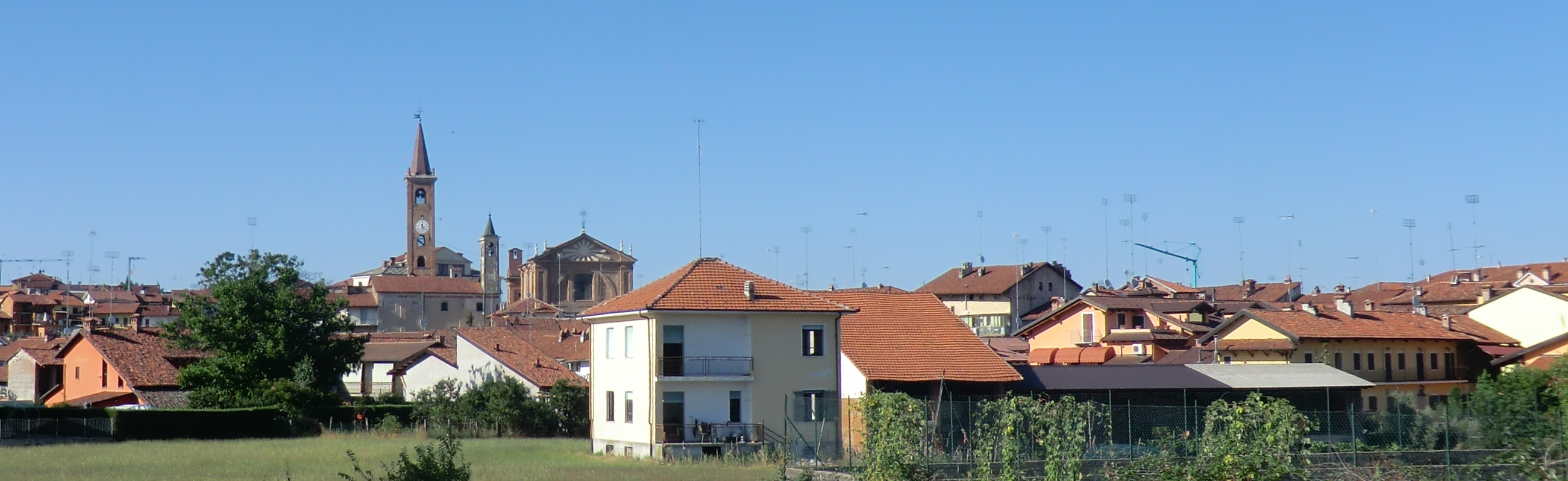

- Coat of arms

- Location within Italy Location within Piedmont
- Coordinates: 44°31′N 7°45′E
- Country: Italy
- Region: Piedmont
- Province: Cuneo (CN)

Government
  - Mayor: Giuseppe Germanetti

Area
  - Total: 28.2 km^{2} (10.9 sq mi)
- Elevation: 383 m (1,257 ft)

Population (1 January 2009)
  - Total: 2,116
  - Density: 75.0/km^{2} (194/sq mi)
- Demonym: Trinitesi
- Time zone: UTC+1 (CET)
  - Summer (DST): UTC+2 (CEST)
- Postal code: 12049
- Dialing code: 0172

Trinità is a comune (municipality) in the Province of Cuneo in the Italian region Piedmont, located about 60 kilometres (37 mi) south of Turin and about 20 kilometres (12 mi) northeast of Cuneo.

Trinità borders the following municipalities: Bene Vagienna, Fossano, Magliano Alpi, and Sant'Albano Stura.

== Notable people ==
- Pietro Miglio, footballer
- Twins Nete, a sisters duo singers of italian popular music.
