= Rocca de' Baldi =

- Comune
- Comune di Rocca de' Baldi
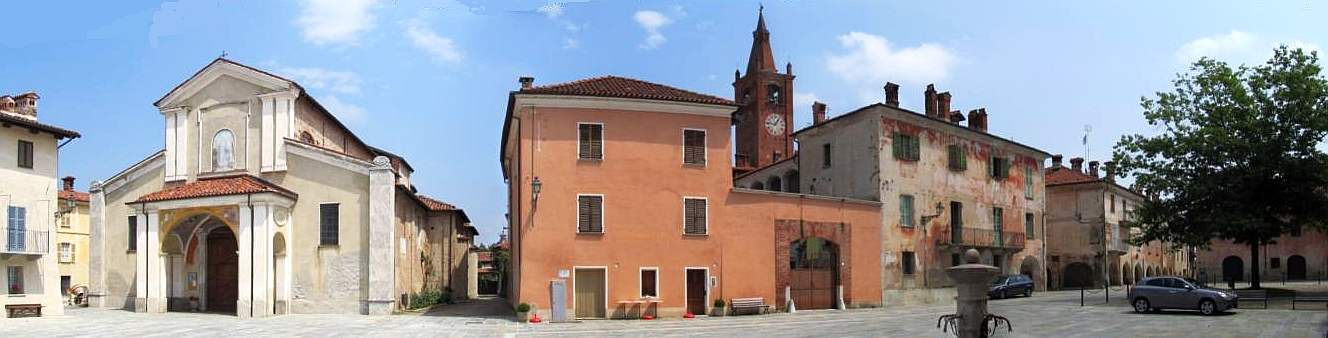

- Location within Italy Location within Piedmont
- Coordinates: 44°26′N 7°45′E
- Country: Italy
- Region: Piedmont
- Province: Province of Cuneo (CN)

Government
  - Mayor: Bruno Curti

Area
  - Total: 26.4 km^{2} (10.2 sq mi)
- Elevation: 414 m (1,358 ft)

Population (31 December 2010)
  - Total: 1,685
  - Density: 63.8/km^{2} (165/sq mi)
- Demonym: Roccadebaldesi
- Time zone: UTC+1 (CET)
  - Summer (DST): UTC+2 (CEST)
- Postal code: 12047
- Dialing code: 0174
- Website: Official website

Rocca de' Baldi is a comune (municipality) in the Province of Cuneo in the Italian region Piedmont, located about 70 kilometres (43 mi) south of Turin and about 15 kilometres (9 mi) northeast of Cuneo.

Rocca de' Baldi borders the following municipalities: Magliano Alpi, Mondovì, Morozzo, and Sant'Albano Stura.
