= Un bacio a mezzanotte =

1952 Italian song

"Un bacio a mezzanotte" (lit. "A Midnight Kiss" or "A Kiss At Midnight") is a 1952 Italian song composed by Gorni Kramer (music) and Garinei & Giovannini (lyrics). Originally part of the revue Gran baraonda (Great chaos), starring Wanda Osiris and Alberto Sordi, it was popularized by the vocal group Quartetto Cetra, as to become a classic of Italian music.

The song was later covered by numerous artists, including Elena Beltrami & Natalino Otto, Nete Twins, Teddy Reno, Quartetto Italiano, Renzo Arbore, Marisa Laurito. In 2016, the pop-rock group Dear Jack presented a new version of the song at the 66th edition of the Sanremo Music Festival.

The song has been used in the 2021 Pixar film Luca.
