= Montanera =

- Comune
- Comune di Montanera
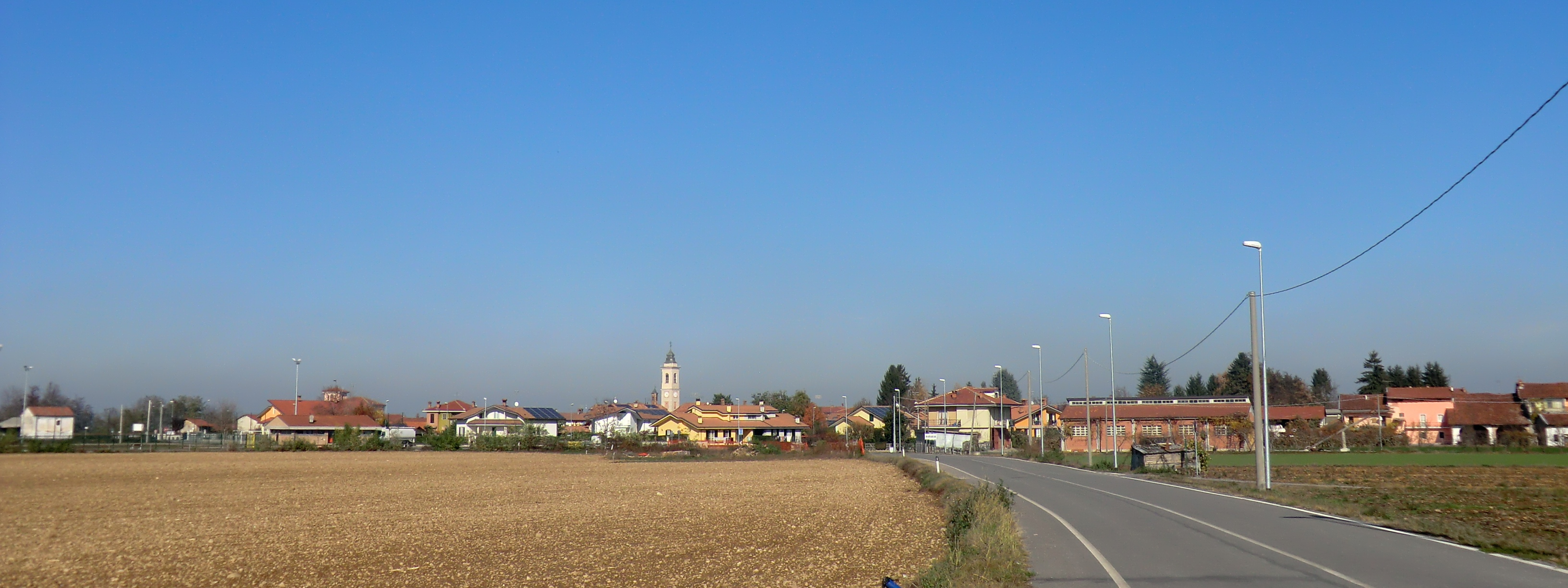

- Location within Italy Location within Piedmont
- Coordinates: 44°28′N 7°40′E
- Country: Italy
- Region: Piedmont
- Province: Cuneo (CN)

Government
  - Mayor: Tommaso Masera

Area
  - Total: 11.63 km^{2} (4.49 sq mi)
- Elevation: 427 m (1,401 ft)

Population (21 June 2021)
  - Total: 716
  - Density: 61.6/km^{2} (159/sq mi)
- Demonym: Montaneresi
- Time zone: UTC+1 (CET)
  - Summer (DST): UTC+2 (CEST)
- Postal code: 12040
- Dialing code: 0171
- Website: Official website

Montanera is a comune (municipality) in the Province of Cuneo in the Italian region Piedmont, located about 70 kilometres (43 mi) south of Turin and about 13 kilometres (8 mi) northeast of Cuneo.

Montanera borders the following municipalities: Castelletto Stura, Centallo, Fossano, Morozzo, and Sant'Albano Stura.

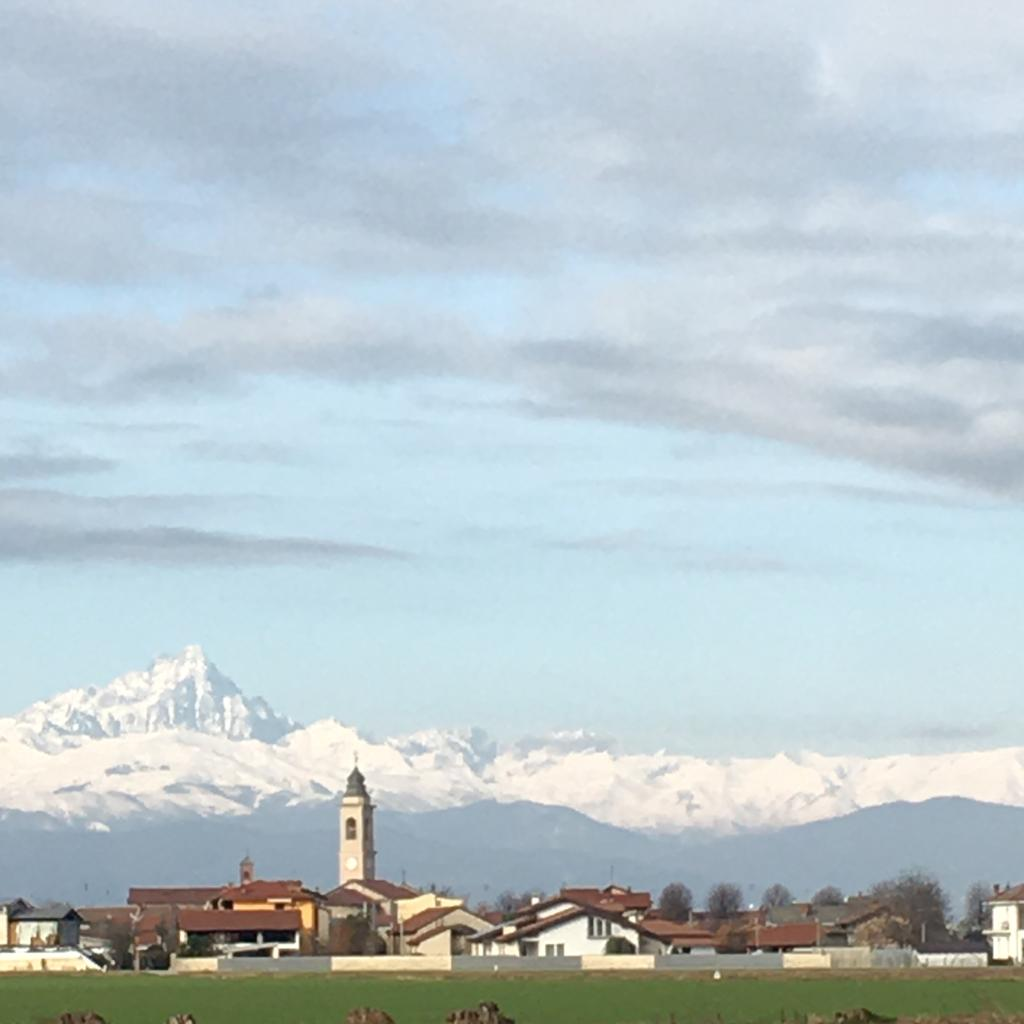
View of Montanera with Monviso

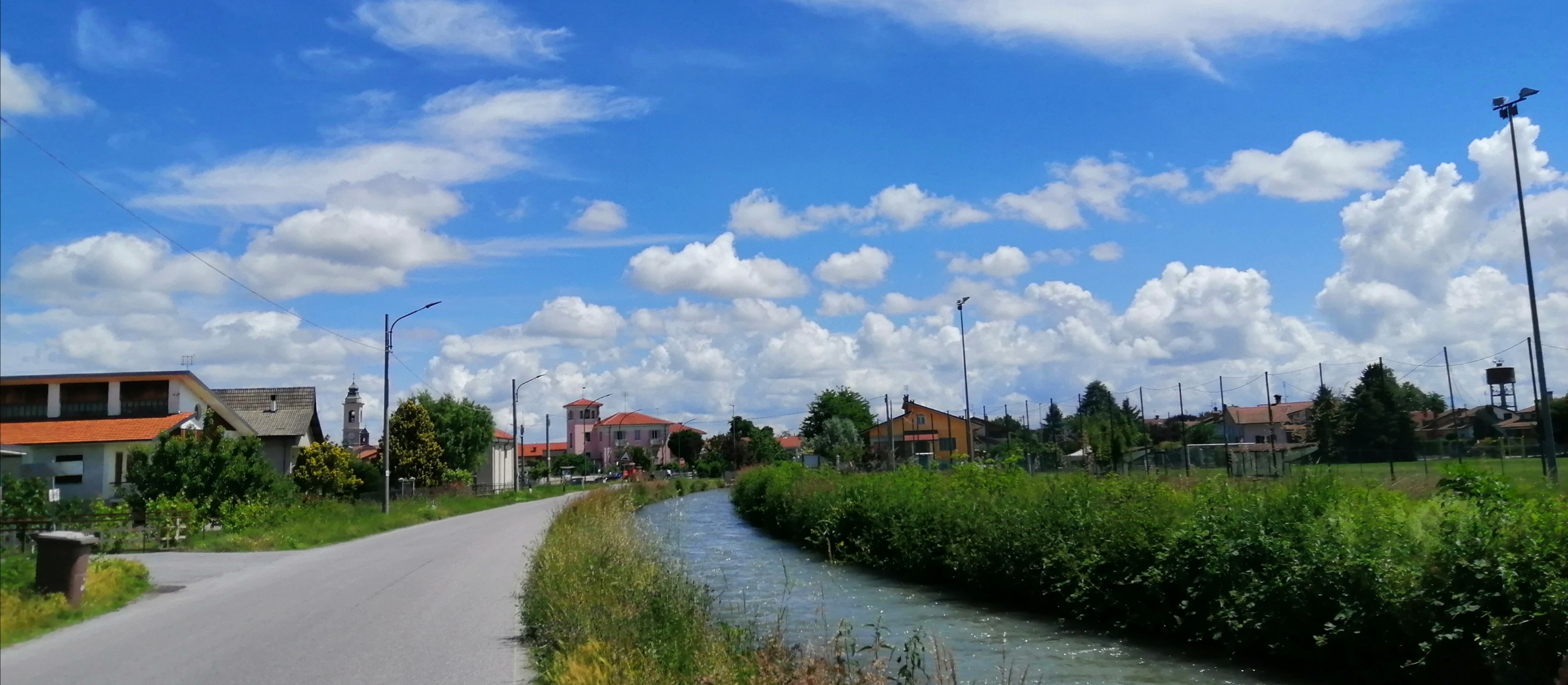
View of Montanera

== History ==
Montanera was founded by the monks of Valcasotto at the beginning of XIII century. The first houses surrounded the pre-existing chapel of Madonna Assunta, popularly called Madonna Lunga. The name of the village can be found in some documents dated 1240-1241 of the Certosa di Valcasotto associated with the words "Locus dicitur praedialis", which means group of farms. In 1360s Montanera was destroyed by a band of soldiers, called the White Company, which invaded all the surrounding territories. In 1424 the village came back to life on the will of Cuneo. The new town was built in the area called "Villa" nowadays, a safer and easier place to defend as close to the river Stura. Between 1619 and 1621 Montanera was entrusted in feud, together with the nearby Castelletto Stura, by the Duke of Savoy Carlo Emanuele I to Amedeo Ponte, Count of Scarnafigi.

Together with Cuneo and the nearby areas, the village in 1796 was under French jurisdiction with Napoleon as a leader.

Starting from the year 1851 there was a school for girls and boys. In 1865 a daily horse-drawn car service was offered to reach Cuneo, to give the opportunity to the villagers to move from Montanera. Then, the service was enlarged adding as destinations also Fossano and Mondovì. As far as river transport is concerned, to reach Murazzo, located on the opposite bank of the river, the municipality in 1813 began to use a ferry received by the French government.

The last Marquises of Montanera were the Tapparelli d'Azeglio, among whom the great scholar Massimo d'Azeglio.

== Nassiriya War memorial ==
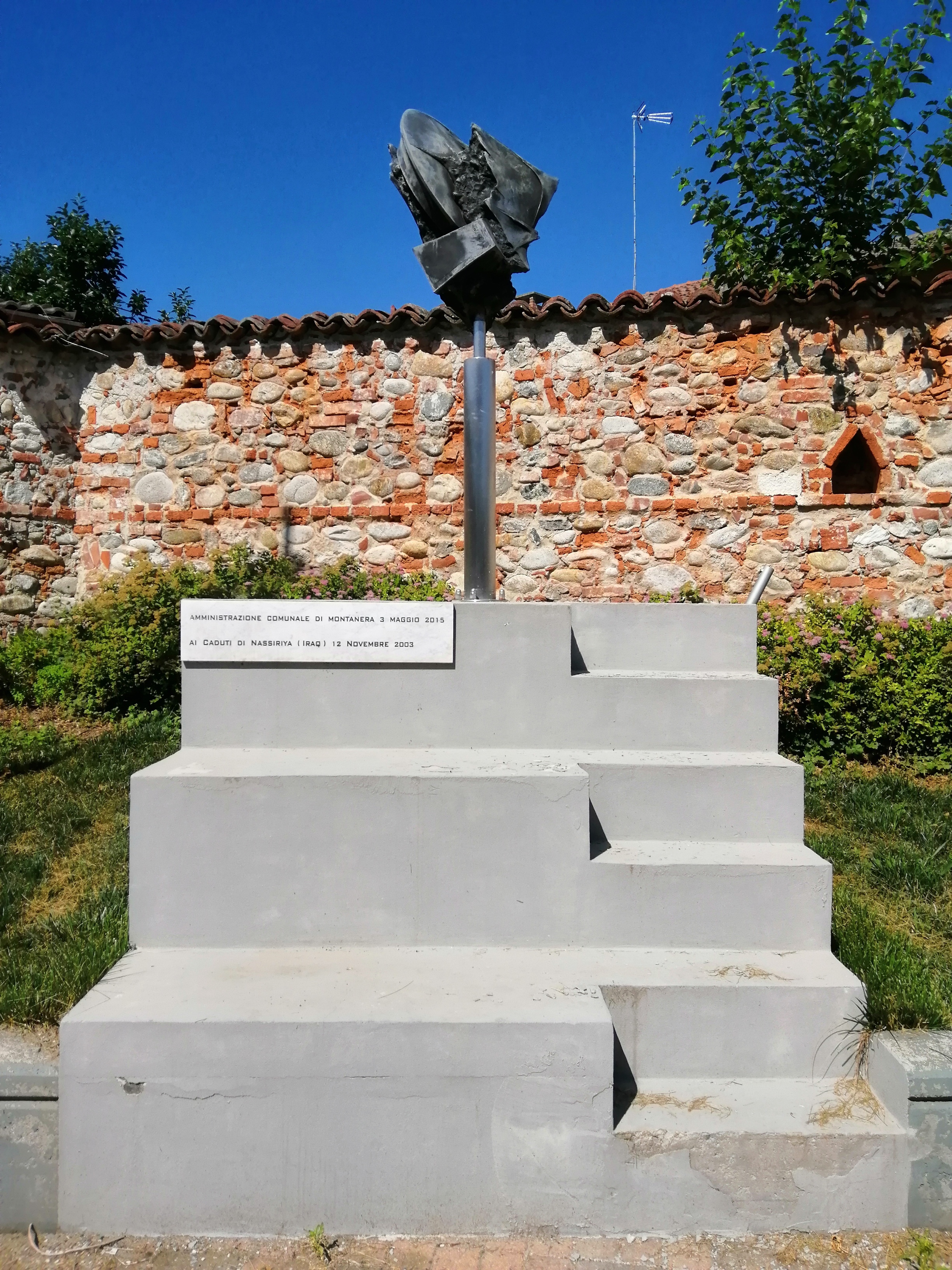
Nassiriya War Memorial

On 2nd and 3 May 2015 Montanera celebrated the 100th anniversary of the First World War and the 70th anniversary of the end of the Second World War, hosting a gathering of the Alpini of Mondovì, to inaugurate the War Memorial of Nassiriya, a sculptural work by the artist Michelangelo Tallone of Paesana, to commemorate the last fallen on mission of Peace in Nassiriya.

== Twin towns ==
Montanera is twinned with:

- Vall de Boí, Spain
