= Sant'Albano Stura =

- Comune
- Comune di Sant'Albano Stura
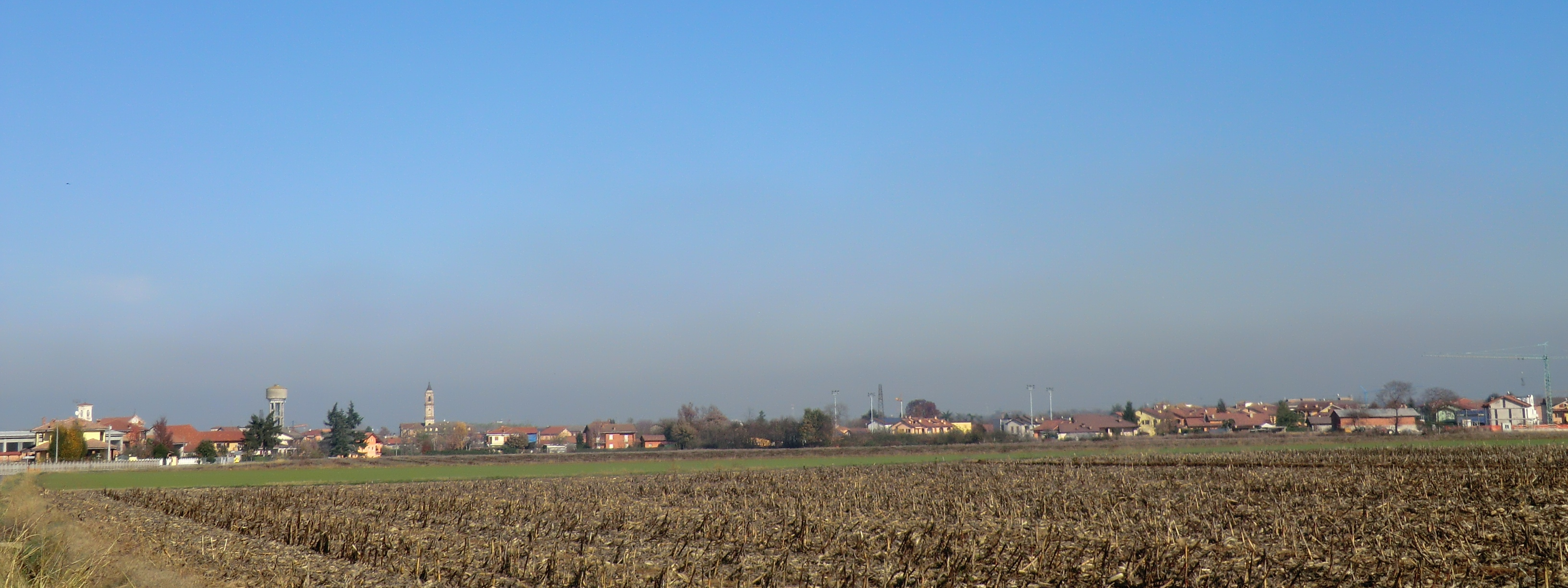

- Location within Italy Location within Piedmont
- Coordinates: 44°31′N 7°43′E
- Country: Italy
- Region: Piedmont
- Province: Cuneo (CN)

Government
  - Mayor: Giorgio Bozzano

Area
  - Total: 27.45 km^{2} (10.60 sq mi)
- Elevation: 378 m (1,240 ft)

Population (31 December 2010)
  - Total: 2,394
  - Density: 87.21/km^{2} (225.9/sq mi)
- Demonym: Santalbanesi
- Time zone: UTC+1 (CET)
  - Summer (DST): UTC+2 (CEST)
- Postal code: 12040
- Dialing code: 0172
- Website: Official website

Sant'Albano Stura is a comune (municipality) in the Province of Cuneo in the Italian region Piedmont, located about 60 kilometres (37 mi) south of Turin and about 20 kilometres (12 mi) northeast of Cuneo.

Sant'Albano Stura borders the following municipalities: Fossano, Magliano Alpi, Montanera, Morozzo, Rocca de' Baldi, and Trinità.
