= Mirabello Castle (Piedmont) =

Castle in Piedmont, Italy

- Chiusa di Pesio, Piedmont in Italy
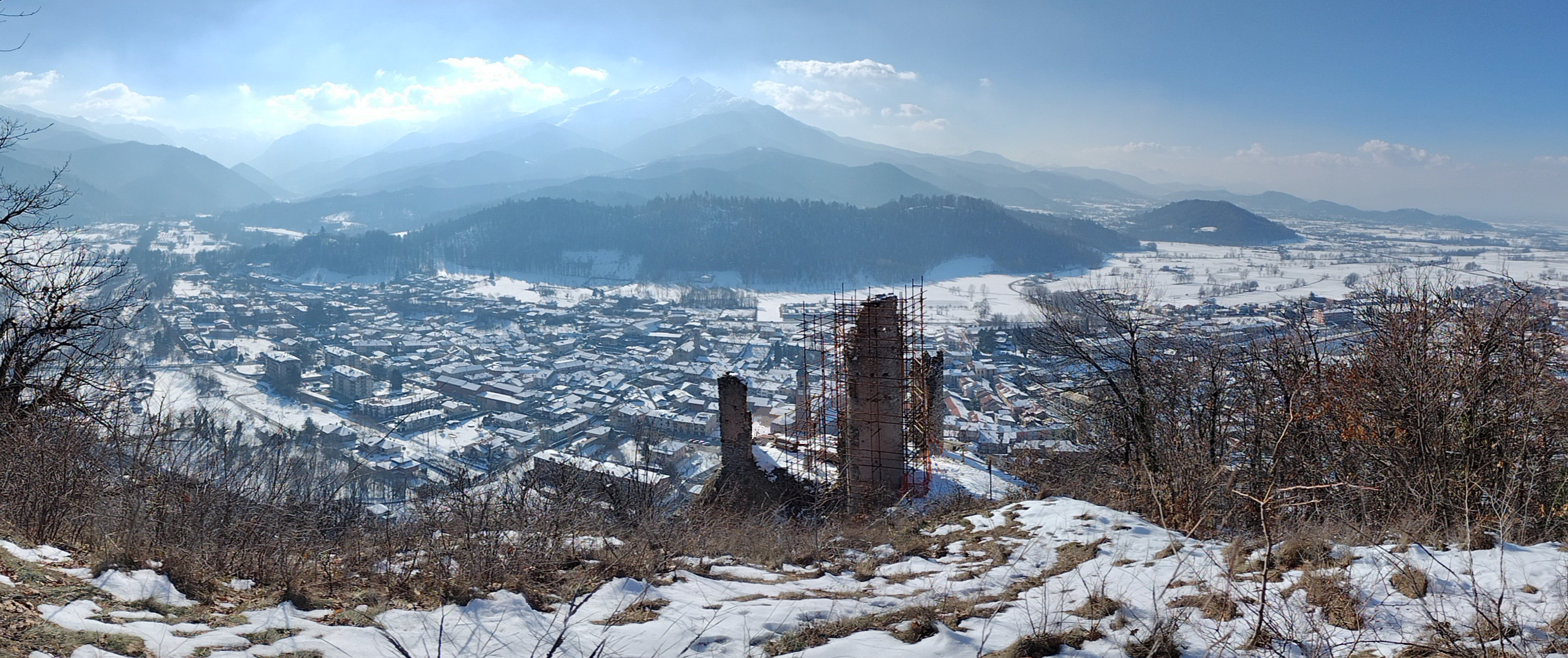
- The castle and, in the background, the center of Chiusa di Pesio

Site information
- Condition: In ruins

Location
- Coordinates: 44.32535°N 7.68215°E

Site history
- Built: 1583
- Materials: Stone, brick

Mirabello Castle (or Chiusa Castle) is an architectural structure of Roman origin located in the municipality of Chiusa di Pesio (Province of Cuneo).

== History ==
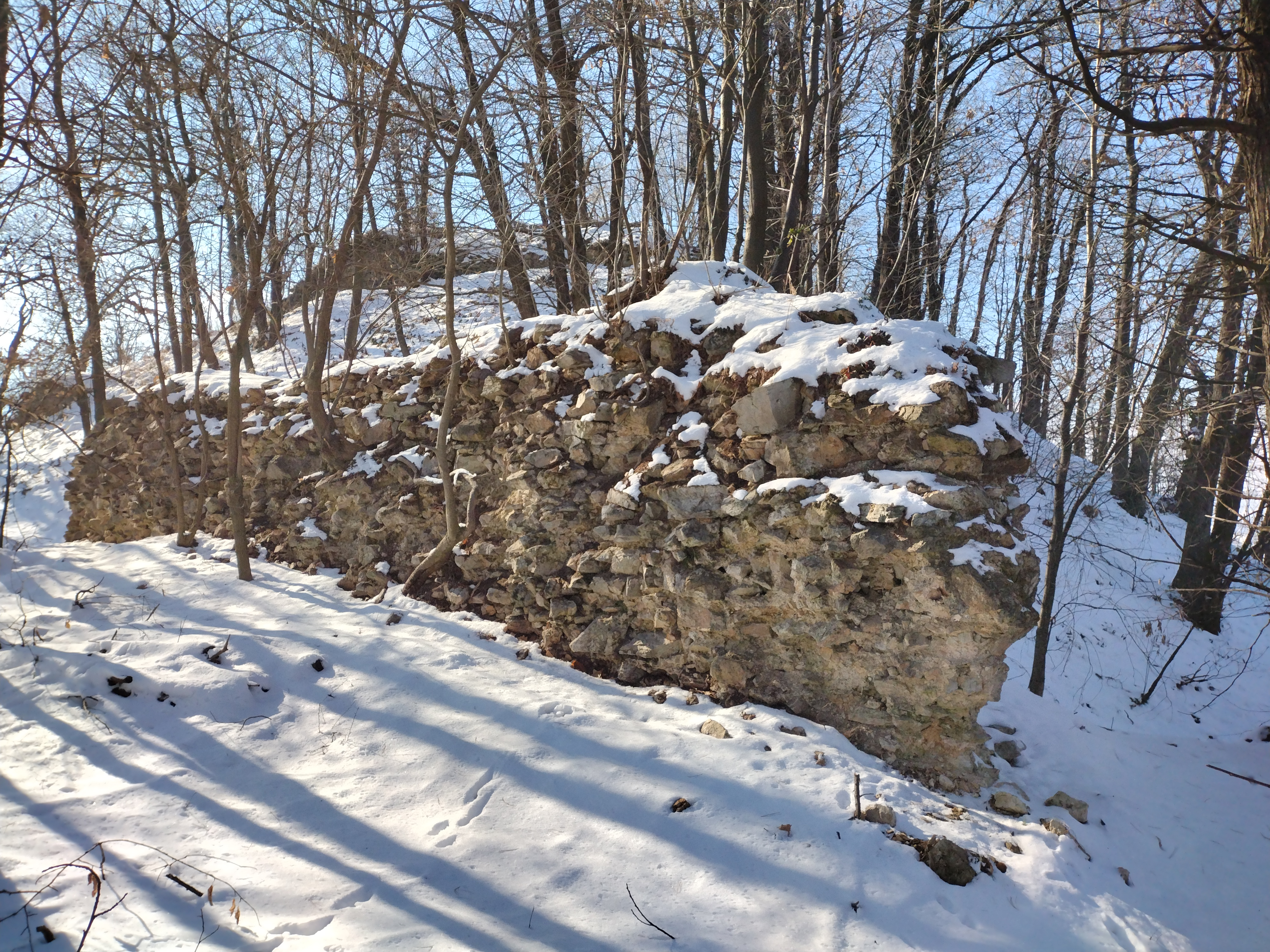
The ruins to the east of the summit

Vestiges of settlements from the protohistoric period, inhabited between the 11th and 9th centuries B.C., that is, between the Bronze Age and the early Iron Age period, have been found on Monte Cavanero.

A spur of the mountain overlooking the present municipal center of Chiusa di Pesio was later fortified in Roman times. The structure was presumably intended to control the road that, passing at the foot of the mountain, connected the Ligurian coast with the Po Valley. The garrison may have consisted of a small army of legionaries; various coins, pottery and remains of burials have been found at the site. The presence of a tombstone, also from the Roman period, was already known in the 19th century.

The shape of the Roman fortification is no longer easily identifiable because the materials of which it was made up were reused first for the construction of some modest dwellings and then to build the feudal castle of which the ruins can currently be seen. Work presumably began in 1565 and was ordered by Agamemnon III, feudal lord of Chiusa di Pesio. Agamemnon in 1583 ceded his fiefdom and his only son, Alberto, took Franciscan vows, thus ending the dynastic line.

The castle was gradually abandoned, and was heavily damaged by an earthquake that struck the area on February 23, 1887, followed by a blizzard that struck in January 1888. During World War II further damage was caused by the bombardment of the building, carried out for intimidation purposes by Nazi occupation troops. In summer 2022, work began on the safety and improvement of the castle, thanks to a program agreement between the Piedmont Region and the municipality of Chiusa di Pesio.

== Features ==
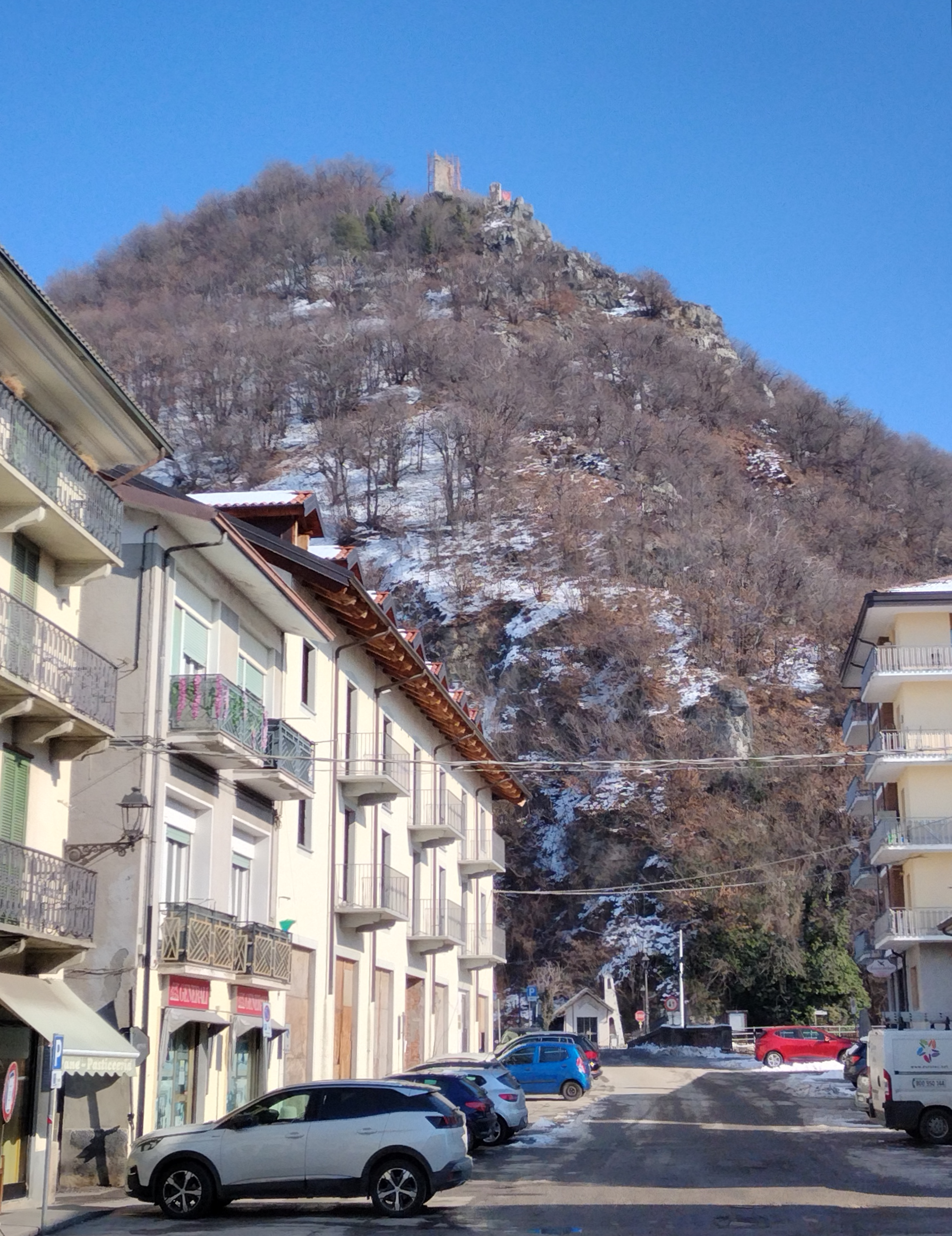
View from the center of Chiusa di Pesio

Only a few ruins remain today of the feudal castle, located on a shelf just below the hilltop on which the original Roman fortress stood. These include a tall cylindrical tower to the northeast and a small part of the masonry of the central keep, where traces of a terracotta pipe remain. The 16th-century building had three floors, which in turn were divided into two rooms in the west-facing part and a hall in the eastern part. The entrance door was to the north, and to ascend to the upper floors there was a spiral staircase, of which traces remain of the steps fixed in the remaining masonry.

== Access ==
The castle can be easily reached on foot by a small road, initially paved and then unpaved, that comes off the connecting road between the center of Chiusa and the Mortè pass. The hike can be completed by climbing the trail to the overhanging Monte Cavanero.

== In literature and media ==
Writer and senator of the Kingdom of Italy Tommaso Vallauri dedicated a novella entitled Il Castello della Chiusa to the castle.

== See also ==
- Monte Cavanero
- Chiusa di Pesio
- Province of Cuneo
