= Castelletto Stura =

- Comune
- Comune di Castelletto Stura
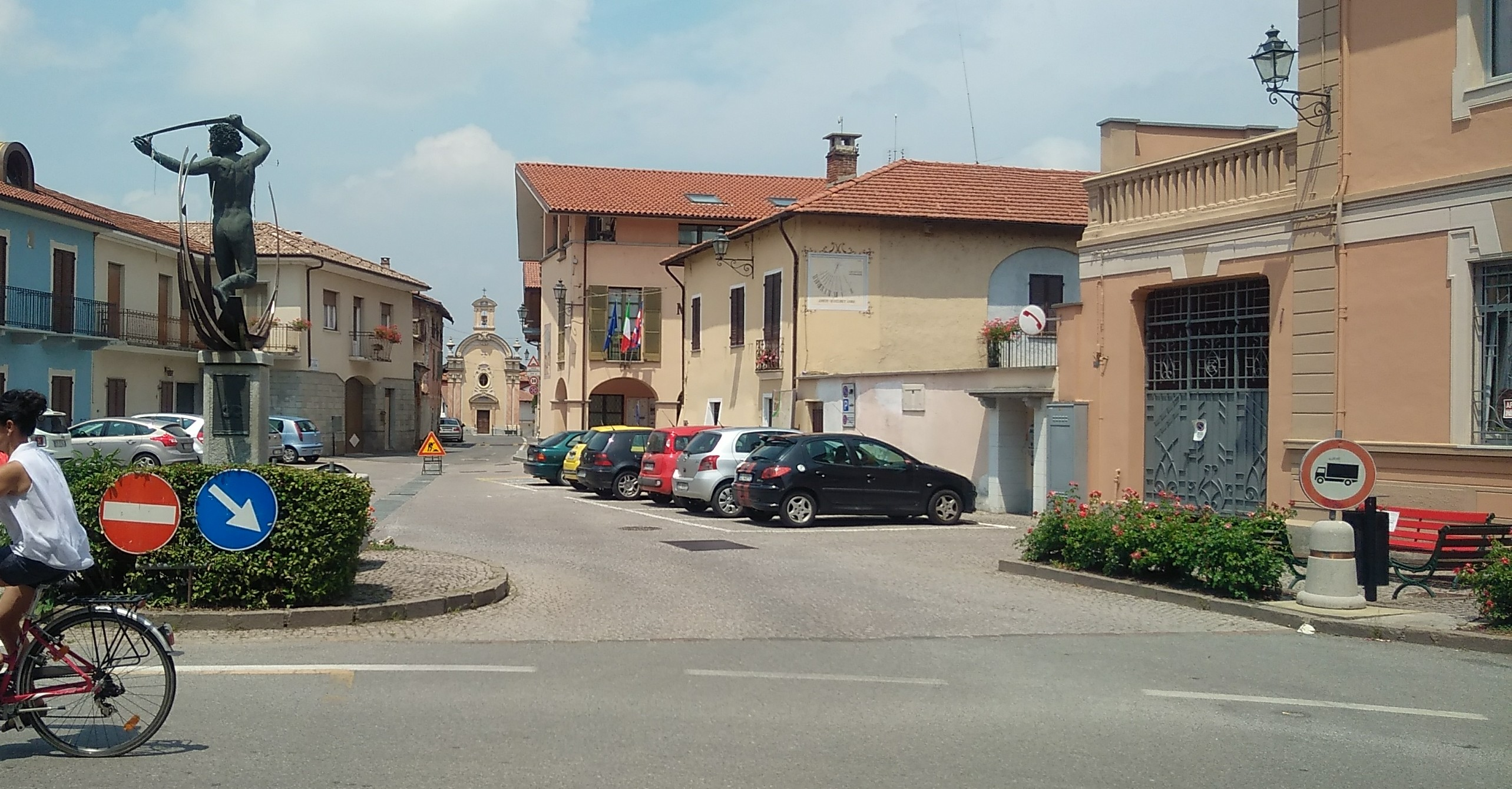

- Coat of arms

- Location within Italy Location within Piedmont
- Coordinates: 44°27′N 7°38′E
- Country: Italy
- Region: Piedmont
- Province: Cuneo (CN)

Government
  - Mayor: Battistino Pecollo

Area
  - Total: 17.13 km^{2} (6.61 sq mi)
- Elevation: 447 m (1,467 ft)

Population (30 November 2017)
  - Total: 1,389
  - Density: 81.09/km^{2} (210.0/sq mi)
- Demonym: Castellettesi
- Time zone: UTC+1 (CET)
  - Summer (DST): UTC+2 (CEST)
- Postal code: 12040
- Dialing code: 0171

Castelletto Stura is a comune (municipality) in the Province of Cuneo in the Italian region Piedmont, located about 70 kilometres (43 mi) south of Turin and about 10 kilometres (6 mi) northeast of Cuneo.

Castelletto Stura borders the following municipalities: Centallo, Cuneo, Montanera, and Morozzo. It is home to the Venchi chocolate manufacturer.
