= Morozzo =

- Comune
- Comune di Morozzo
- Coat of arms

- Location within Italy Location within Piedmont
- Coordinates: 44°25′N 7°43′E
- Country: Italy
- Region: Piedmont
- Province: Cuneo (CN)

Government
  - Mayor: Med. Mauro Fissore

Area
  - Total: 22.19 km^{2} (8.57 sq mi)
- Elevation: 431 m (1,414 ft)

Population (30 November 2017)
  - Total: 2,040
  - Density: 91.9/km^{2} (238/sq mi)
- Demonym: Morozzesi
- Time zone: UTC+1 (CET)
  - Summer (DST): UTC+2 (CEST)
- Postal code: 12040
- Dialing code: 0171
- Patron saint: San Magno
- Saint day: Last Sunday in July

Morozzo is a comune (municipality) in the Province of Cuneo in the Italian region Piedmont, located about 70 kilometres (43 mi) south of Turin and about 14 kilometres (9 mi) northeast of Cuneo.

Morozzo borders the following municipalities: Beinette, Castelletto Stura, Cuneo, Margarita, Mondovì, Montanera, Rocca de' Baldi, and Sant'Albano Stura.
