= Pietro Miglio =

Italian footballer

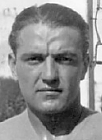

Personal information
- Date of birth: 11 August 1910
- Place of birth: Trinità, Italy
- Date of death: 16 June 1992 (aged 81)
- Place of death: Turin, Italy
- Position: Goalkeeper

Senior career*
| Years | Team | Apps | (Gls) |
| 1929–1930 | Crocetta Torino | | |
| 1930–1933 | Ambrosiana-Inter | 6 | (0) |
| 1933–1935 | Juventus Trapani | | |
| 1935–1938 | Messina | 55 | (0) |
| 1938–1939 | Casale | 17 | (0) |
| 1939–1940 | Gil Terranova Olbia | 12 | (0) |
| 1940–1941 | Teramo | | |
| 1941–1943 | Pescara | 56 | (0) |
| 1943–1944 | Medese | | |
| 1944–1946 | Vigevano | | |
- * Club domestic league appearances and goals

Pietro Miglio (born 11 August 1910; died 16 June 1992) was an Italian professional football player.
