= Venchi =

Italian gourmet chocolate brand

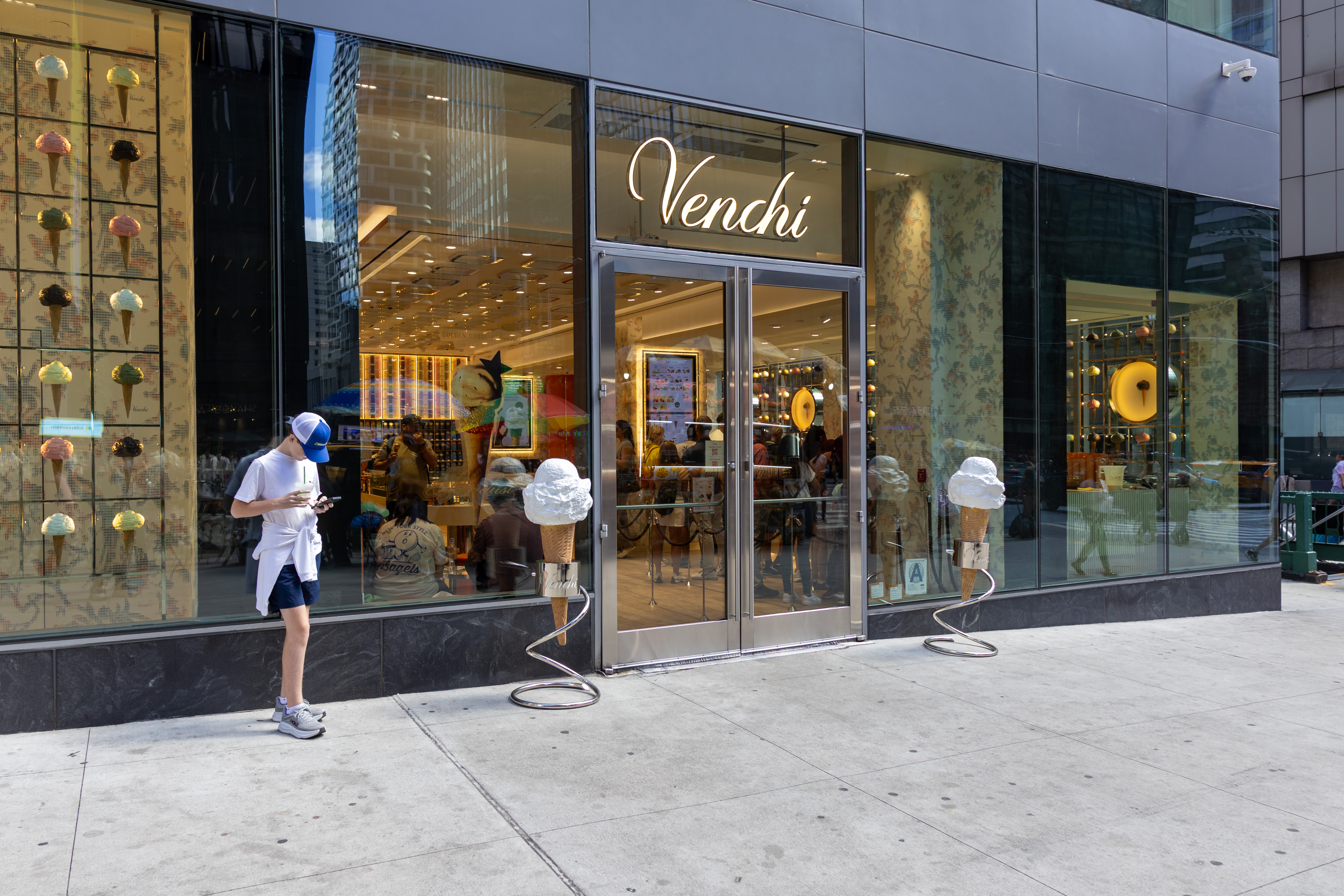
- Venchi store in New York City, 2025.
- Type: Private company
- Industry: Food
- Founded: 1878 (148 years ago) in Turin, Piedmont, Italy
- Founder: Silviano Venchi
- Headquarters: Castelletto Stura, Cuneo, Piedmont, Italy
- Area served: Worldwide
- Key people: Daniele Ferrero (CEO, president); Giovanni Battista Mantelli; Nicolò Cangioli (commercial director)
- Products: Chocolate; gelato
- Revenue: €250,000,000 (2025)
- Net income: €10,000,000 (2017)
- Number of employees: 1500+ (2024)
- Website: venchi.com

Venchi S.p.A. (Italian pronunciation: [ˈvɛŋki, ˈveŋki]) is an Italian food company, founded in 1878 by Silviano Venchi, based in Castelletto Stura, in the province of Cuneo. It specialises in the production and sale of chocolate and gelato.

== Products ==
Venchi primarily focuses on producing chocolate in a variety of forms. The main product categories include chocolate, which encompasses chocolates, bars and pralines; gelato; and a selection of foods and beverages available for consumption at the points of sale.

The company uses carefully selected ingredients to offer products free from palm oil with a low sugar content. The key ingredients include local Piedmont hazelnuts (grown in the nearby Langhe region) as well as green pistachios of Bronte.

== Sustainability ==
Venchi S.p.A. has adopted a sustainability strategy based on three main pillars: products, the planet and people. The company is committed to reducing the environmental impact of its packaging. Its targets for 2025 include the Rainforest Alliance certification for 100% of the cocoa used in its products, improved energy efficiency, resource optimisation, and a recycling programme for zero waste. For example, in 2021, Venchi reduced the amount of electricity used by its production facility by 50% compared to 2019, despite a 15% increase in the amount of chocolate produced. This endeavour was co-financed by the ROP Piemonte ERDF 2014–2020.

The company also uses ingredients that meet standards such as Rainforest Alliance–certified cocoa and Piedmont hazelnuts.

== Acknowledgements ==
In 2004, Venchi's Chocoviar, 75% extra dark chocolate grains made from pure hand-processed South American cocoa masses, won the Vassoio d'Oro at EuroChocolate in Perugia.

For multiple years, Venchi has been recognised in several categories for the "Premio Tavoletta d'Oro", a leading awards for quality chocolate in Italy.

== Financial data ==
In 2023, the company's turnover exceeded 200 million euros.
