= Chiusa di Pesio =

- Comune
- Comune di Chiusa di Pesio
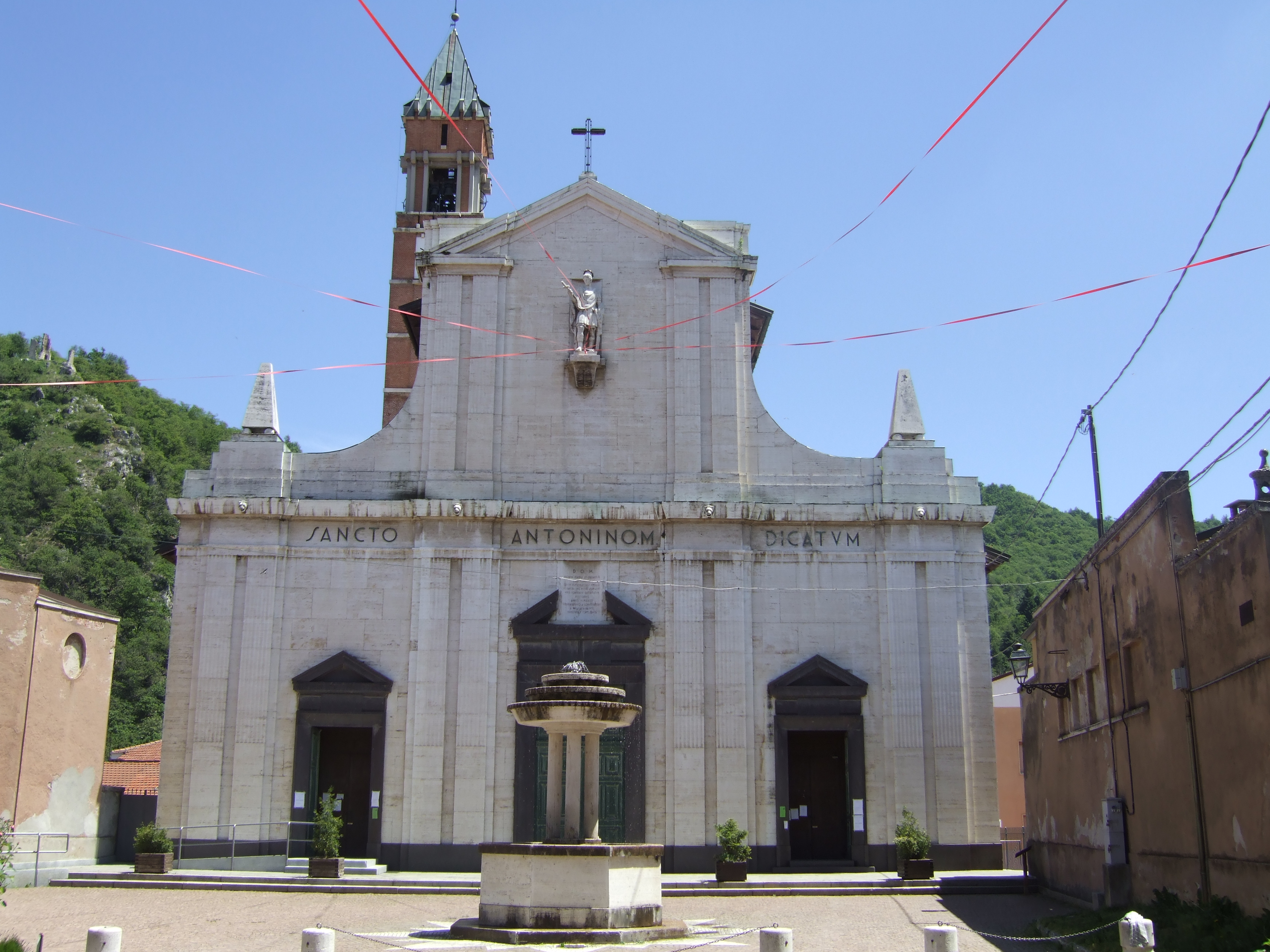
- Parish church.

- Coat of arms

- Location within Italy Location within Piedmont
- Coordinates: 44°19′N 7°41′E
- Country: Italy
- Region: Piedmont
- Province: Cuneo (CN)

Government
  - Mayor: Claudio Baudino

Area
  - Total: 95.02 km^{2} (36.69 sq mi)
- Elevation: 575 m (1,886 ft)

Population (30 November 2017)
  - Total: 3,644
  - Density: 38.35/km^{2} (99.33/sq mi)
- Demonym: Chiusani
- Time zone: UTC+1 (CET)
  - Summer (DST): UTC+2 (CEST)
- Postal code: 12013
- Dialing code: 0171
- Website: Official website

Chiusa di Pesio is a comune (municipality) of 3,650 inhabitants in the Province of Cuneo in the Italian region Piedmont, located about 80 km south of Turin and about 15 km south-east of Cuneo, on the border with France.

== Geography ==
Chiusa di Pesio is located at the beginning of the Pesio Valley (its altitude ranges from 575 metres of the main town up to over 2,600 metres of the highest peaks). The main hamlets are San Bartolomeo and Vigna, located in the highest part of the valley, and Combe, Santa Maria Rocca and Abrau which are located more in the plain. Pesio River crosses the whole valley and its spring is called "Pis" (at 1,500 meters above sea level). The town is located between two hills, Mount Cavanero and Mombrisone. On the first one there are the ruins of the Mirabello Castle that dominates the town, and on the second one there is a nineteenth century hunting building. Chiusa di Pesio is 15 km from Cuneo and the nearest motorway is in Mondovì (called A6 Torino-Savona), located about 20 km south of Chiusa di Pesio.

== Certosa ==
The Certosa di Pesio is a Carthusian monastery built from 1173 to 1802.

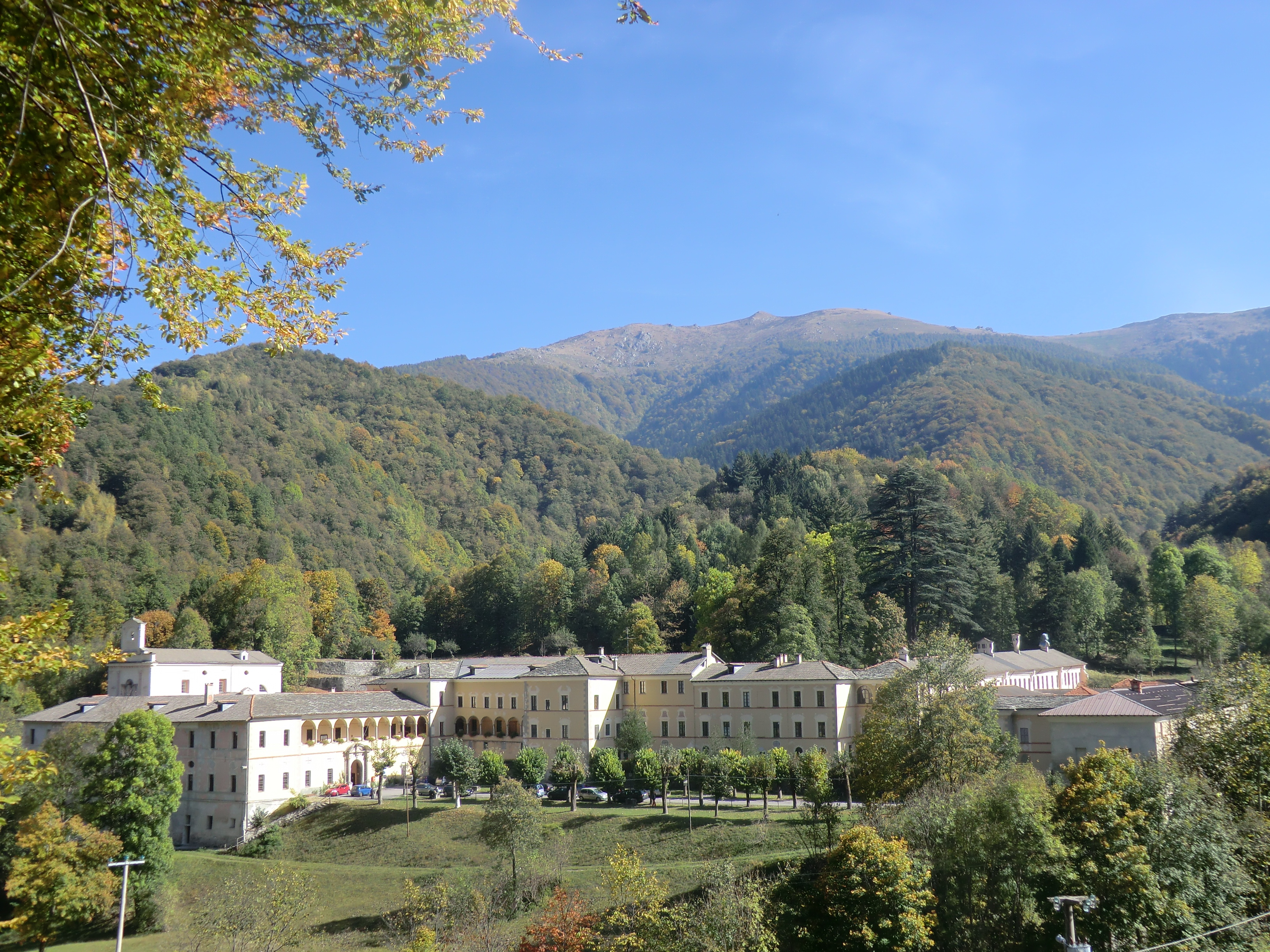
Pesio Charterhouse

== See also ==
- Mirabello Castle (Piedmont)
