= Cuneo =

Cuneo Coni (Piedmontese)
- Comune
- Comune di Cuneo
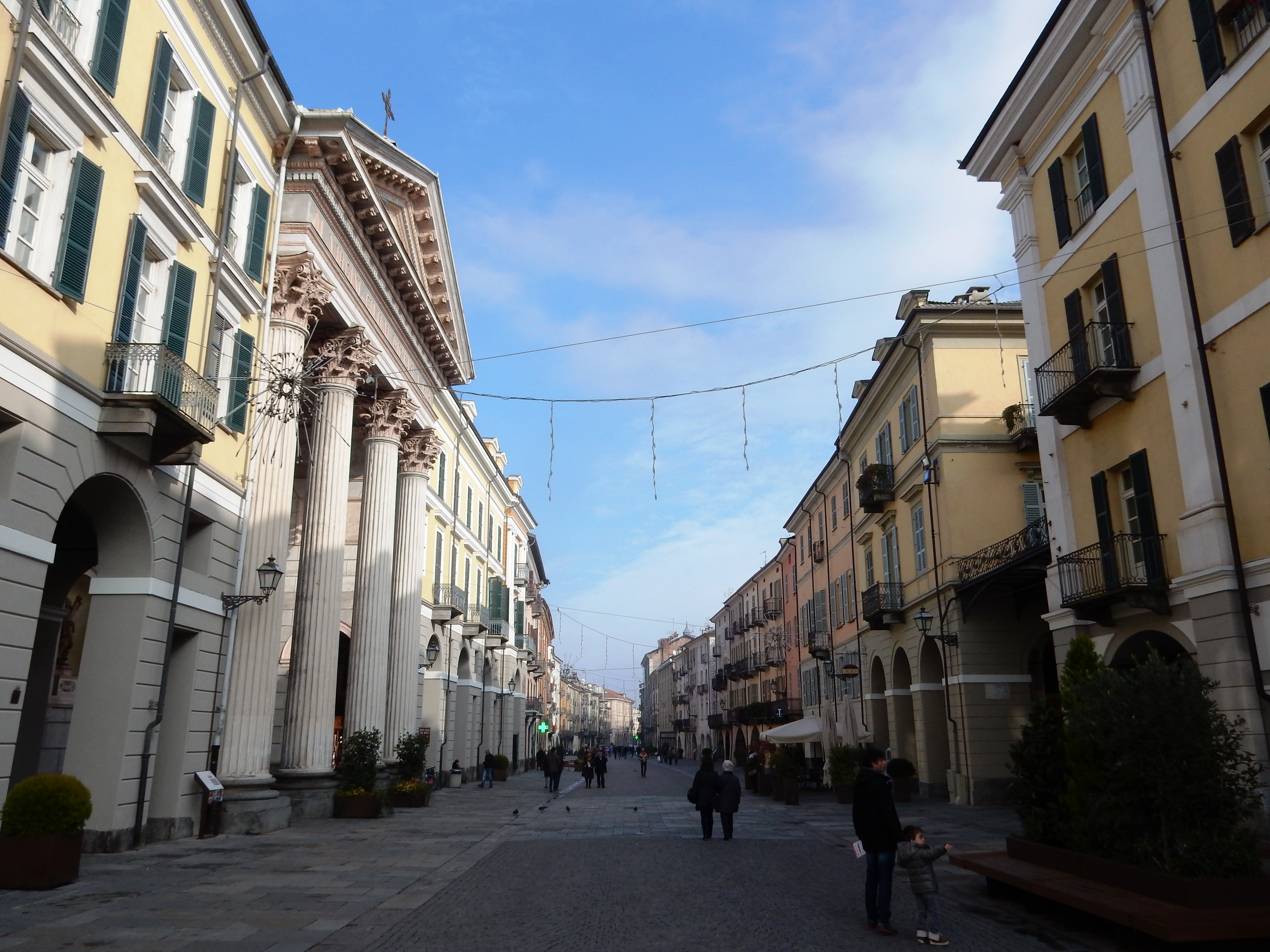
- Via Roma

- Flag Coat of arms

- Location of Cuneo in Italy Cuneo (Piedmont)
- Coordinates: 44°23′22″N 7°32′52″E
- Country: Italy
- Region: Piedmont
- Province: Cuneo
- Frazioni: Borgo Gesso, Borgo San Giuseppe, Confreria, Madonna Dell'Olmo, Madonna Delle Grazie, Passatore, Roata Rossi, Ronchi, San Benigno, San Pietro Del Gallo, San Rocco Castagnaretta, Spinetta, Bombonina Soprana, Cascina Barca, Cascina Belvedere, Cascina Bombonina Sottana, Cascina Bonada, Cascina Cartignano, Cascina Combe, Cascina Cordero, Cascina Filatura, Cascina Forfice, Cascina Grangia, Cascina La Provvidenza, Cascina Malaspina, Cascina Mombasiglia, Cascina Rivagnola, Cascina Roero, Cascina Sciolla, Cascina Tortagrassa, Cascina Tre Tetti, Cascina Zumaglia, Cascinali Della Trinità, Cascinali Di Torre Roa, Colombaro Ferraris, Filatoio Quaranta, La Battistina, Ruata Gauteri, Segheria Torrette, Tetti Brignone, Tetti Milano, Tetti Pesio, Tetti Ravot, Tetto Buon Riposo, Tetto Coniglio, Tetto Cordonotto, Tetto Corvo, Tetto Delle Figlie, Tetto Farina, Tetto Menone, Tetto Patta, Tetto Plonasso, Tetto Ratti, Tetto Rubatti Soprano, Tetto Rubatti Sottano, Tetto San Giacomo, Torre Acceglio Inferiore, Torre Bianca, Torre Di Bava, Torre Di Brizio, Trucchi

Government
  - Mayor: Patrizia Manassero (PD)

Area
  - Total: 119.67 km^{2} (46.20 sq mi)
- Elevation: 534 m (1,752 ft)
- Highest elevation: 615 m (2,018 ft)
- Lowest elevation: 431 m (1,414 ft)

Population (2026)
  - Total: 55,747
  - Density: 465.84/km^{2} (1,206.5/sq mi)
- Demonym: Italian: cuneese (pl. -i)
- Time zone: UTC+1 (CET)
  - Summer (DST): UTC+2 (CEST)
- Postal code: 12100
- Dialing code: 0171
- ISTAT code: 004078
- Patron saint: Saint Michael
- Saint day: 29 September
- Website: Official website

Cuneo (Italian: [ˈkuːneo]; Piedmontese: Coni [ˈkʊni]; Occitan: Coni [ˈkuni]; French: Coni [kɔni]) is a city and comune (municipality) in the region of Piedmont in northern Italy, the capital of the province of Cuneo, the 4th-largest of Italy's provinces by area. With a population of 55,747, it is the 5th most populous city in Piedmont.

It is located at an elevation of 550 metres (1,800 ft) in the south-west of Piedmont, at the confluence of the rivers Stura and Gesso.

Cuneo borders the municipalities of Beinette, Borgo San Dalmazzo, Boves, Busca, Caraglio, Castelletto Stura, Centallo, Cervasca, Morozzo, Peveragno, Tarantasca and Vignolo.

It is located near six mountain passes:

- Colle della Maddalena at 1,996 metres (6,549 ft)
- Colle di Tenda at 1,871 metres (6,138 ft) – Tunnel of Tenda at 1,300 metres (4,300 ft), 3 kilometres (1.9 mi) long
- Colle del Melogno at 1,027 metres (3,369 ft)
- Colle San Bernardo at 957 metres (3,140 ft)
- Colle di Nava at 934 metres (3,064 ft)
- Colle di Cadibona at 459 metres (1,506 ft).

== History ==
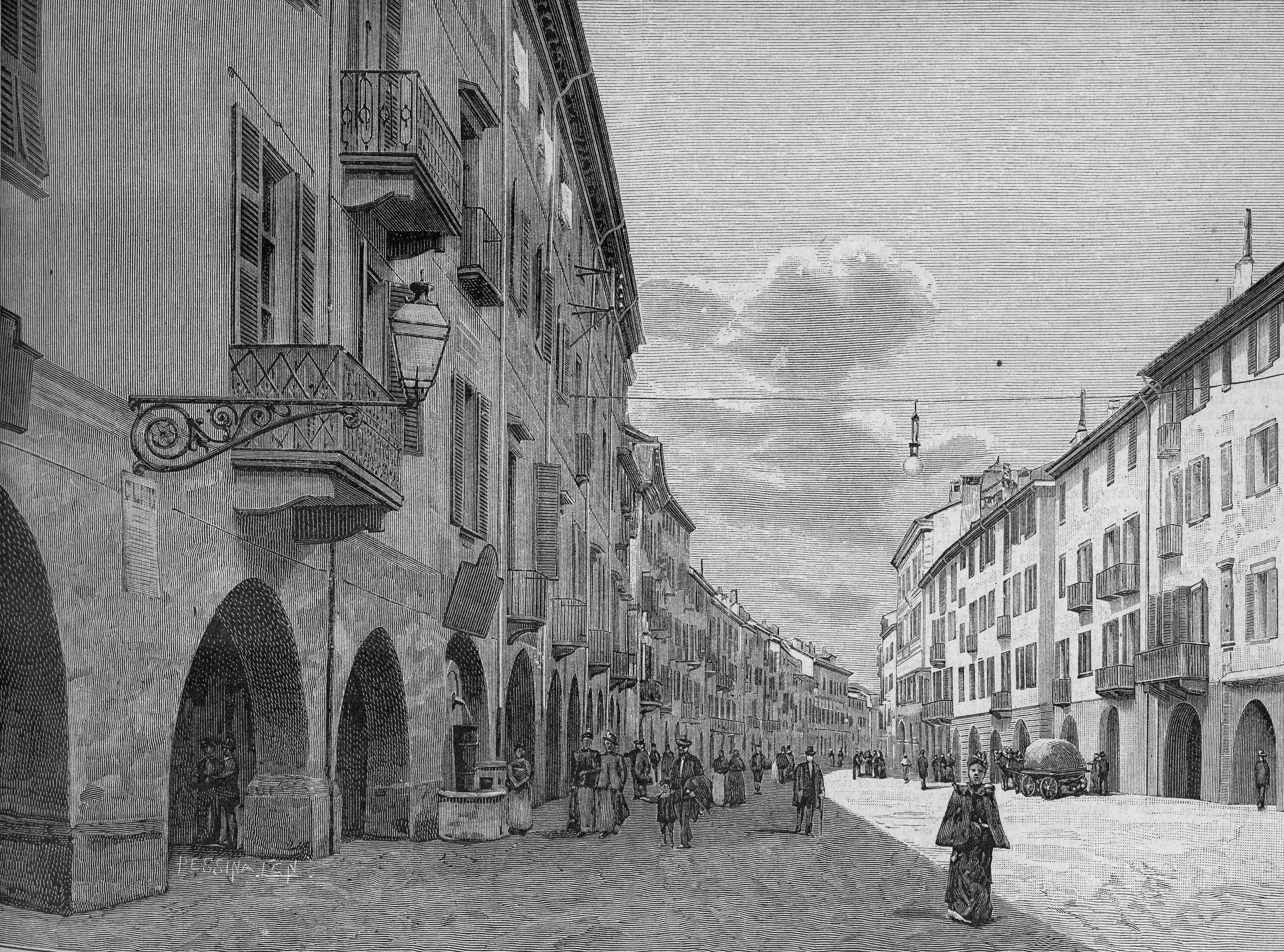
19th-century image of Cuneo

Cuneo was founded in 1198 by the local population, who declared it an independent commune, freeing themselves from the authority of the bishops of Asti and the marquisses of Montferrat and Saluzzo. In 1210, the latter occupied it, and in 1231 the Cuneesi rebelled. In 1238, they were recognized as a free commune by Emperor Frederick II.

In 1259, the independence of Cuneo ceased forever, as it gave itself, also to take protection against its more powerful neighbours, to Charles I of Anjou, who was then the Count of Provence. Together with Alba, it was the main Angevine possession in Northern Italy; Angevine rule interrupted by periods under the control of Saluzzo, Savoy, and the Visconti of Milan was ended in 1382 when Cuneo was acquired by the Duchy of Savoy.

Cuneo became an important stronghold of the expanding Savoy state. The city was thus besieged several times by France: first in 1515 by Swiss troops of Francis I of France, then again in 1542, 1557, 1639, 1641, 1691 and, during the War of the Austrian Succession, in 1741. Cuneo resisted each siege successfully. The city was taken by France only during the Napoleonic Wars and was made the capital of the Stura department. After the restoration of the Kingdom of Sardinia, and the unification of Italy, Cuneo became the capital of its namesake province in 1859. In 1862, Cuneo was the location of a Polish Military School moved from Genoa, which trained Polish officers in exile, the overwhelming majority of whom then fought in the Polish January Uprising in the Russian Partition of Poland in 1863–1864 (see also Italy–Poland relations).

During World War II, from 1943 to 1945, it was one of the main centres of partisan resistance against the German occupation of Italy. In 1943, Cuneo's Jewish citizens were briefly arrested and imprisoned at the nearby Borgo San Dalmazzo concentration camp by the order of Minister of the Interior Guido Buffarini Guidi. They were freed before the Minister's orders came into effect and most community members fled Cuneo into hiding.

However, on 9 December 1944, the Cuneo Police Department reopened the camp and imprisoned the remaining Jewish residents of Cuneo most of whom were then deported to Auschwitz. Few survived according to reports. Italian partisans liberated Cuneo from the German and Italian fascist occupation on 25 April 1945. The retreating fascist forces murdered the remaining six Jewish prisoners being held at Cuneo's local prison.

== Climate ==
Cuneo has a temperate sub-continental climate (Cfa, according to the Köppen climate classification), with cold winters and hot, dry summers. However, it is situated more than 500 metres (1,640 feet) above sea level, which helps to make summers more bearable: the hottest month, July, has an average temperature of 21.6 °C (70.9 °F). The coldest, January, averages 1.7 °C (35.1 °F). Annual precipitation is about 962 mm (37.9 in), distributed over 81 days. The rainfall pattern is similar to that of Turin, with two maxima—one primary and one secondary (spring and autumn) and two minima (summer and winter). The driest month is July, 44 millimetres (1.7 in). Snowfalls are frequent owing to high elevation and wind patterns.

Climate data for Cuneo (2002–2020)
Month	Jan	Feb	Mar	Apr	May	Jun	Jul	Aug	Sep	Oct	Nov	Dec	Year
Mean daily maximum °C (°F)	8.4 (47.1)	9.5 (49.1)	13.6 (56.5)	17.4 (63.3)	21.7 (71.1)	26.6 (79.9)	28.9 (84.0)	27.9 (82.2)	23.5 (74.3)	17.4 (63.3)	11.8 (53.2)	8.8 (47.8)	18.0 (64.3)
Daily mean °C (°F)	3.3 (37.9)	4.3 (39.7)	8.3 (46.9)	12.3 (54.1)	16.3 (61.3)	21.0 (69.8)	23.1 (73.6)	22.4 (72.3)	18.4 (65.1)	12.9 (55.2)	7.5 (45.5)	4.0 (39.2)	12.8 (55.1)
Mean daily minimum °C (°F)	−1.9 (28.6)	−0.8 (30.6)	3.0 (37.4)	7.1 (44.8)	10.9 (51.6)	15.4 (59.7)	17.4 (63.3)	16.9 (62.4)	13.2 (55.8)	8.4 (47.1)	3.2 (37.8)	−0.8 (30.6)	7.7 (45.8)
Average precipitation mm (inches)	62 (2.4)	70 (2.8)	99 (3.9)	105 (4.1)	116 (4.6)	98 (3.9)	56 (2.2)	71 (2.8)	82 (3.2)	119 (4.7)	111 (4.4)	76 (3.0)	1,065 (42)
Average precipitation days (≥ 1.0 mm)	4	5	7	9	10	7	6	6	6	7	9	6	82
Source 1: Climi e viaggi (precipitation days)
Source 2: Istituto Superiore per la Protezione e la Ricerca Ambientale (precipitation 1951–1980)

== Demographics ==
Historical population
Year	Pop.	±%
1861	22,731	—
1871	23,453	+3.2%
1881	24,746	+5.5%
1901	26,879	+8.6%
1911	29,421	+9.5%
1921	31,741	+7.9%
1931	35,522	+11.9%
1936	35,321	−0.6%
1951	39,867	+12.9%
1961	46,065	+15.5%
1971	54,544	+18.4%
1981	55,875	+2.4%
1991	55,794	−0.1%
2001	52,334	−6.2%
2011	55,013	+5.1%
2021	55,557	+1.0%
Source: ISTAT

As of 2026, the population is 55,747, of which 48.9% are male, and 51.1% are female. Minors make up 14.1% of the population, and seniors make up 27.1%.

=== Immigration ===
As of 2025, of the known countries of birth of 55,173 residents, the most numerous are: Italy (47,551 – 86.2%), Albania (1,730 – 3.1%), Romania (1,220 – 2.2%), Morocco (766 – 1.4%), Philippines (350 – 0.6%).

== Main sights ==
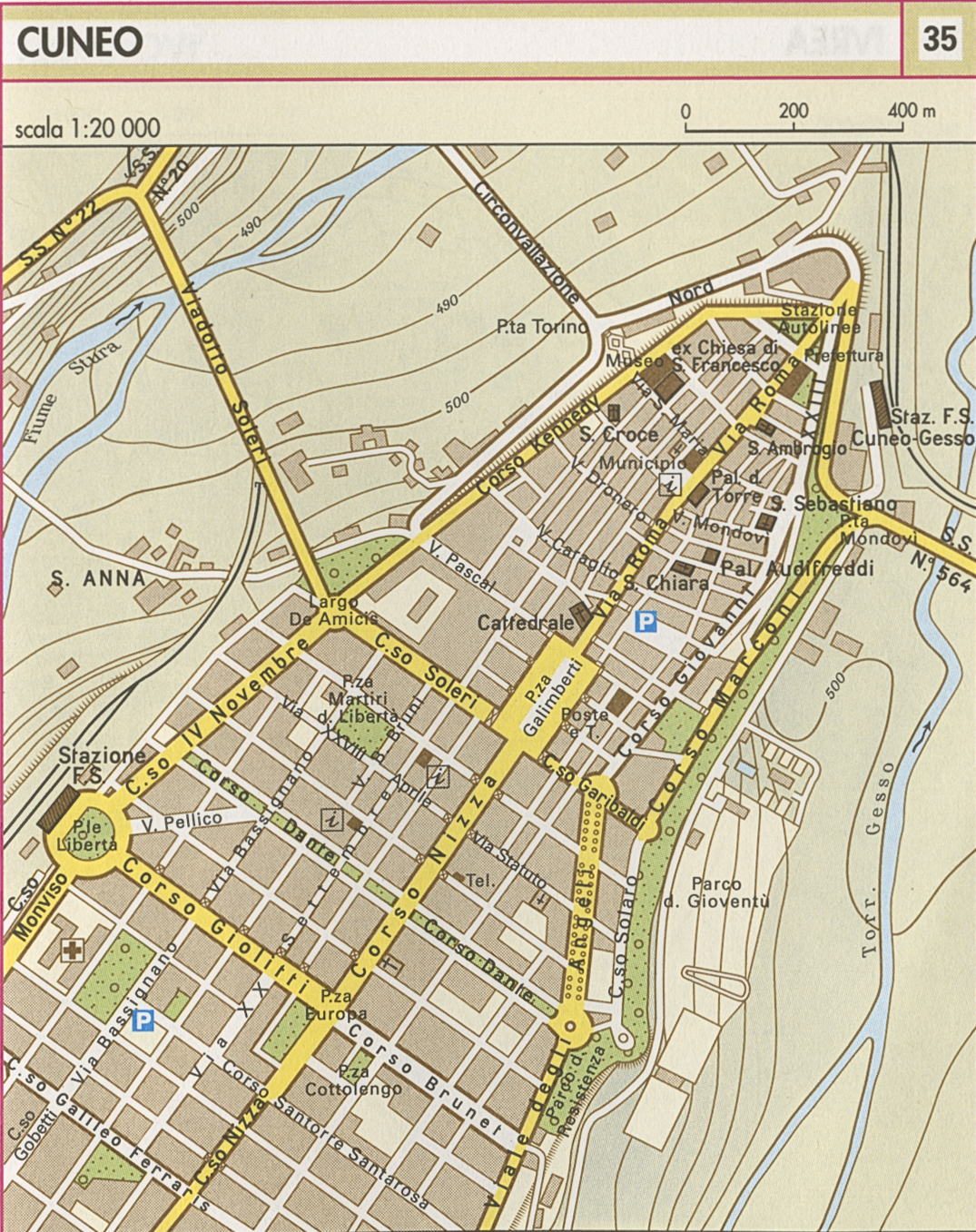
Map of city centre

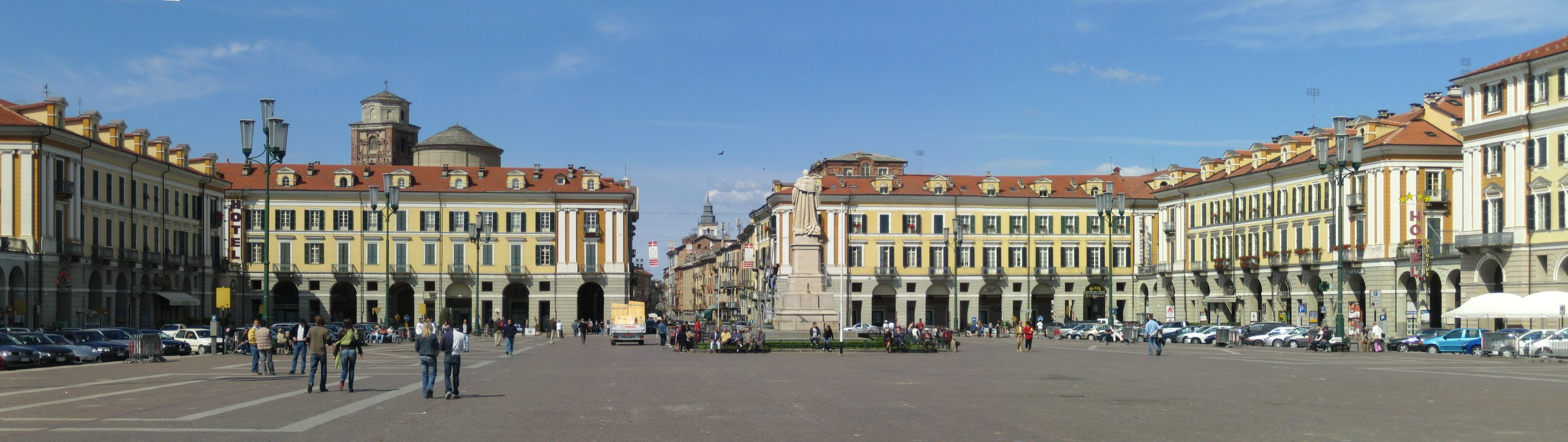
Piazza Galimberti, the city's main square

- Villa Oldofredi Tadini, built in the 14th and 15th centuries as a watchtower. It is now a museum housing collections of the owners, the Mocchia and Oldofredi Tadini families.
- Villa Tornaforte, surrounded by an English-style park.
- Civic Museum
- Railway Museum
- Churches of Santa Croce, San Giovanni Decollato and Santissima Annunziata, housing paintings by Giovan Francesco Gaggini.
- Panoramic funicular that connects plateau to Gesso river.
- Monument of Stura and Gesso in Torino Square
- The median way of the plateau (Rome Avenue, Galimberti Square and Nice Avenue): the commercial heart of Cuneo.
- New Bridge (Ponte Nuovo) between the center of the city and Madonna dell' Olmo
- Monument at Peano's curve
- Palazzo Uffici Finanziari (PUF), highest edifice in the city at about 50 metres (160 ft)
- Parri's Park, a big green park under construction in the suburbs of the city.

== Subdivisions ==
Most important and populated: Centro storico, Cuneo centro, Cuneo nuova, San Paolo, Donatello, Gramsci, San Rocco, Cerialdo, Confreria and Borgo San Giuseppe.

== Cuisine ==
Cuneo's specialty is Cuneesi al rhum, small meringues with dark chocolate coating and a rum-based chocolate filling. They are a creation of Andrea Arione (1923), who also registered the name, and sold them in the bar still located in the central square, Piazza Galimberti; another claim makes them a creation of pastry chef Pietro Galletti from Dronero. Another specialty is "raviolini al plin", a small ravioli pasta made with meat and vegetables.

== Sport ==
=== Volleyball ===
There is an important volleyball club, Piemonte Volley who won 1 Italian Volleyball League, 3 CEV Cup, 2 CEV SuperCup, 4 Italian Volleyball Cup and 3 Italian Volleyball SuperCup.

=== Football ===
Associazione Calcio Cuneo 1905 (A.C. Cuneo 1905) who plays in the 3rd level of Italian football.

=== Rugby ===
Cuneo has also a Rugby Team called "Cuneo Pedona Rugby", currently playing in the National "Serie C" League. The team is playing in the Municipal Field of Madonna dell'Olmo.

=== Cycling ===
Many times stage of Giro d'Italia. In 2016, for the first time in the Giro history, the race arrived in Sant'Anna di Vinadio sanctuary, the highest sanctuary in Europe, 2035 m, and the day after, on 29 May, the race started from Cuneo.

Since 1987 Cuneo has been the start and arrival point of the amateur international race "La Fausto Coppi".

== Transport ==
The city is served by Cuneo International Airport which is located 20 km (12 mi) north of the city centre. However, the airport only provides routes to limited destinations, the nearest domestic and international airport is Turin Airport, located 129 km (80 mi) north east of Cuneo. Other nearby airports can also be received such as Nice Côte d'Azur Airport in France, located 136 km (85 mi) south west and Genoa Cristoforo Colombo Airport, located 142 km (88 mi) west of Cuneo.

== Notable people ==
- Annibale Santorre di Rossi de Pomarolo, Count of Santarosa (1783–1825), early Risorgimento leader.
- Franco Andrea Bonelli (1784–1830), ornithologist, entomologist and collector.
- Giuseppe Peano (1858–1932), mathematician.
- Giovanni Battista Ceirano (1860) – automobile pioneer, joint founder of Ceirano, Well-Eyes bicycles, Well-Eyes cars – the first F.I.A.T., SCAT (Società Ceirano Automobili Torino)
- Matteo Ceirano 1870 – automobile pioneer, joint founder of Itala Fabrica Automobile and S.P.A. (Società Piemontese Automobili)
- Ernesto Ceirano 1875 – Winner of 1911 and 1914 Targa Florio in SCAT automobiles.
- Giorgio Federico Ghedini (1892–1965), composer.
- Bartolomeo Vanzetti (1888–1927), anarchist.
- Tancredi "Duccio" Galimberti (1906–1944), anti-fascist lawyer
- Nuto Revelli (1919–2004), partisan and writer.
- Cesare Damiano (born 1948), politician.
- Carlo Petrini (born 1949), born in the province of Cuneo in the commune of Bra in Italy, is the founder of the International Slow Food Movement. In 2004, he founded the University of Gastronomic Sciences, a school intended to bridge the gap between agriculture and gastronomy.
- Piergiorgio Odifreddi (born 1950), mathematician, logician and aficionado of the history of science.
- Alviero Martini (born 1950), fashion designer.
- Bruno Cipolla (1952–2026), Italian rowing coxswain and Olympic champion
- Celestino Migliore (born 1952), Papal diplomat.
- Livia Turco (born 1955), politician.
- Michele Ferrero (1925–2015), patriarch of Italian chocolate dynasty Ferrero Group. He inherited the company from his father Pietro in the 1950s and turned it into one of the world's largest confectionery makers, whose brands include Ferrero Rocher hazelnut chocolates, Nutella and Tic Tac.
- Elisa Balsamo (born 1998), professional road cyclist and winner in 2021 of the UCI Elite Women's Road World Championship.

== International relations ==
=== Twin towns – sister cities ===
Cuneo is twinned with:

- Santa Fe, Argentina
- Nice, France
- Richard Toll, Senegal
- Fürstenberg/Havel, Germany

== See also ==
- Venchi
- Ferrero SpA
- Cemetery
