= De Argüello =

De Argüello (Spanish pronunciation: [de aɾˈɣweʎo]) is a Spanish surname. Notable people with the surname include:

- Fernando de Argüello (fl.1644–1647), Spanish soldier and Governor of New Mexico
- Francisco José Gómez de Argüello y Wirtz, also known as Kiko Argüello (born 1939), Spanish artist and co-initiator of the Neocatechumenal Way
- María Soledad Ortega de Argüello (1797–1874), Californio ranchera and socialite

== See also ==
- Arguello, comune in Italy
- Argüello
