= Alonso de Pacheco y Herédia =

Spanish politician

Alonso de Pacheco de Herédia

12th Spanish Governor of New Mexico
- In office 1643–1643
- Preceded by: Francisco Gomes
- Succeeded by: Fernando de Argüello

Personal details
- Profession: political

Alonso de Pacheco y Herédia was acting governor of New Mexico in 1643, following Francisco Gomes and succeeded by Fernando de Argüello.

== Career in Santa Fe de Nuevo México ==
Pacheco was sent to New Mexico to punish people suspected of having killed Governor Luis de Rosas. He set foot in the provincial capital in the fall of 1642. However, he hid the reasons that brought him to New Mexico, since the reasons were confidential. He developed an investigation to find the culprits, which took him several months.

On July 21, he ordered the assassination and the beheading of the eight soldiers he believed they were the leaders of the revolt. After that execution, he granted a pardon to the rest of the rebels of Santa Fe de Nuevo México. However, he ordered them to obey the policies of the Crown, otherwise he would kill them. In addition, he placed the heads of those executed throughout the square of the provincial capital so that the population would remember what would happen to them if they did not obey him. The relatives of the murdered people denounced Pacheco to the authorities. Fray Tomás Manso, who served as attorney general, participated in Pacheco's trial, as he led witnesses who supported the friars to testify. On the other hand, Pacheco forced a custodian surnamed Cobarrubias to bury again, in the church of the province, a man surnamed Sandoval who had been excommunicated. He threatened to expel him from New Mexico permanently and forever, or even subject him to harsher punishment, if he did not obey him.

Pacheco was appointed Governor of New Mexico in 1643. He only governed New Mexico for a short period of time, less than a year. However, during that period of time, he carried out policies that had a major impact on the population. In August of that year Pacheco sent a group of soldiers to the Santo Domingo region to order the Indigenous to oppose the friars.
