= San Miguel Mission =

Historic church in Santa Fe, New Mexico

San Miguel Chapel
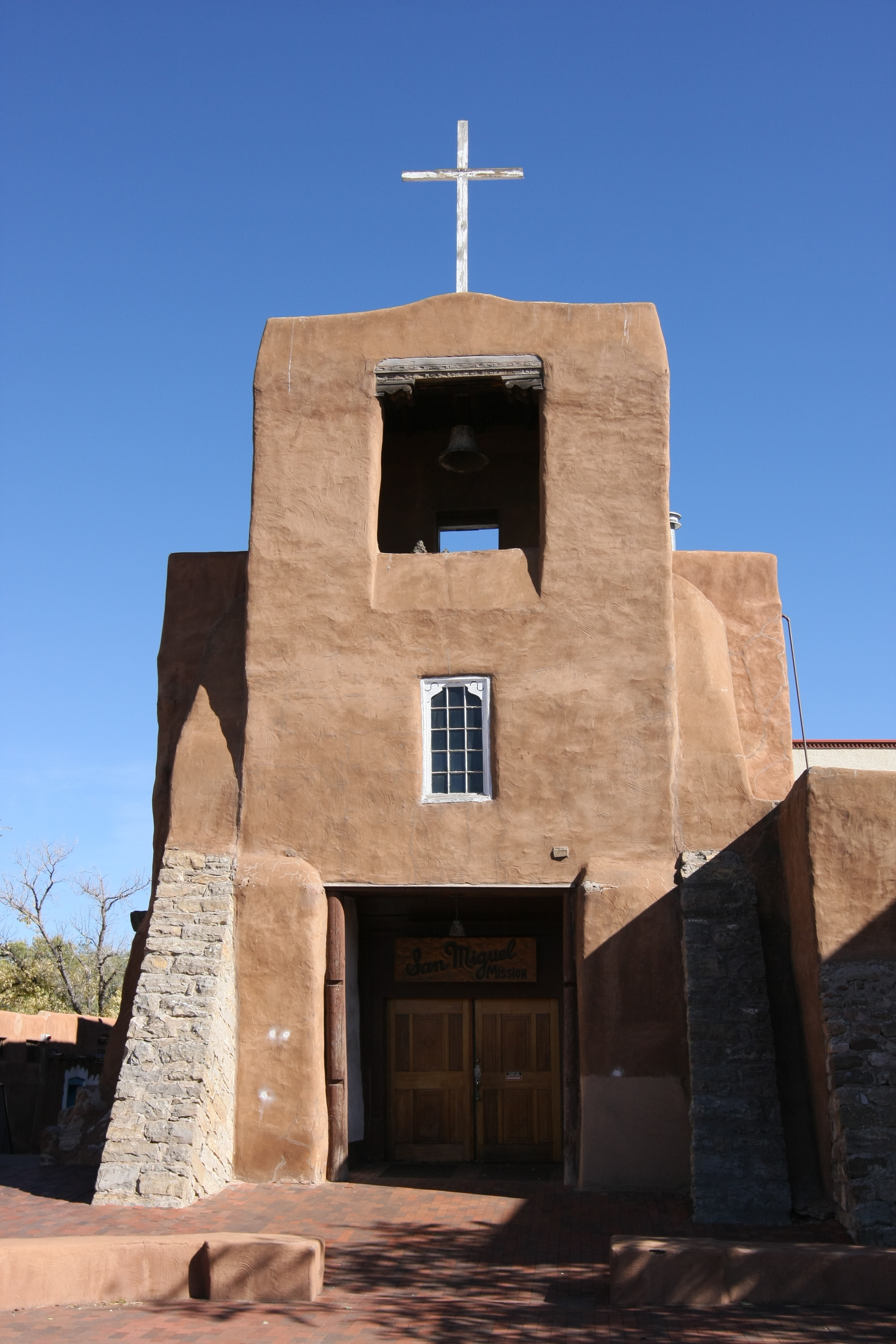
- The front exterior to the Chapel of San Miguel

- Location within New Mexico Location within the United States

Religion
- Affiliation: Roman Catholic
- Ecclesiastical or organisational status: Privately owned by Saint Michael's High School/The Christian Brothers
- Status: Consecrated

Location
- Location: Santa Fe, New Mexico, U.S.
- State: New Mexico
- Coordinates: 35.68343°N 105.93767°W

Architecture
- Type: Adobe construction in the Romanesque fortress church style, with heavily buttressed walls and battlements on the flat roof.
- Style: Spanish
- Completed: c. 1610

Specifications
- Direction of façade: west
- Capacity: 120
- Materials: adobe mud

Website
- sanmiguelchapelsantafe.org
- San Miguel Mission
- U.S. National Historic Landmark District – Contributing property
- U.S. Historic district – Contributing property
- Part of: Barrio de Analco Historic District (ID68000032)

Significant dates
- Designated NHLDCP: October 18, 1968
- Designated CP: November 24, 1968

San Miguel Chapel is a Spanish colonial mission church in Santa Fe, New Mexico. Originally built around 1610, it is often referred to as the oldest church building in the continental United States. The church was rebuilt twice, once in the mid to late 17th century, and again in 1710 following the Pueblo Revolt. In both cases earlier pieces of the building may have been reused, though it is unclear to what extent. The wooden reredos, which includes a wooden statue of Saint Michael dating back to at least 1709, was added in 1798.

The church is a contributing property in the Barrio De Analco Historic District, which is a U.S. National Historic Landmark. As of 2020, Mass is still offered at the chapel on the 1st Sunday of the month at 3pm.

== History ==
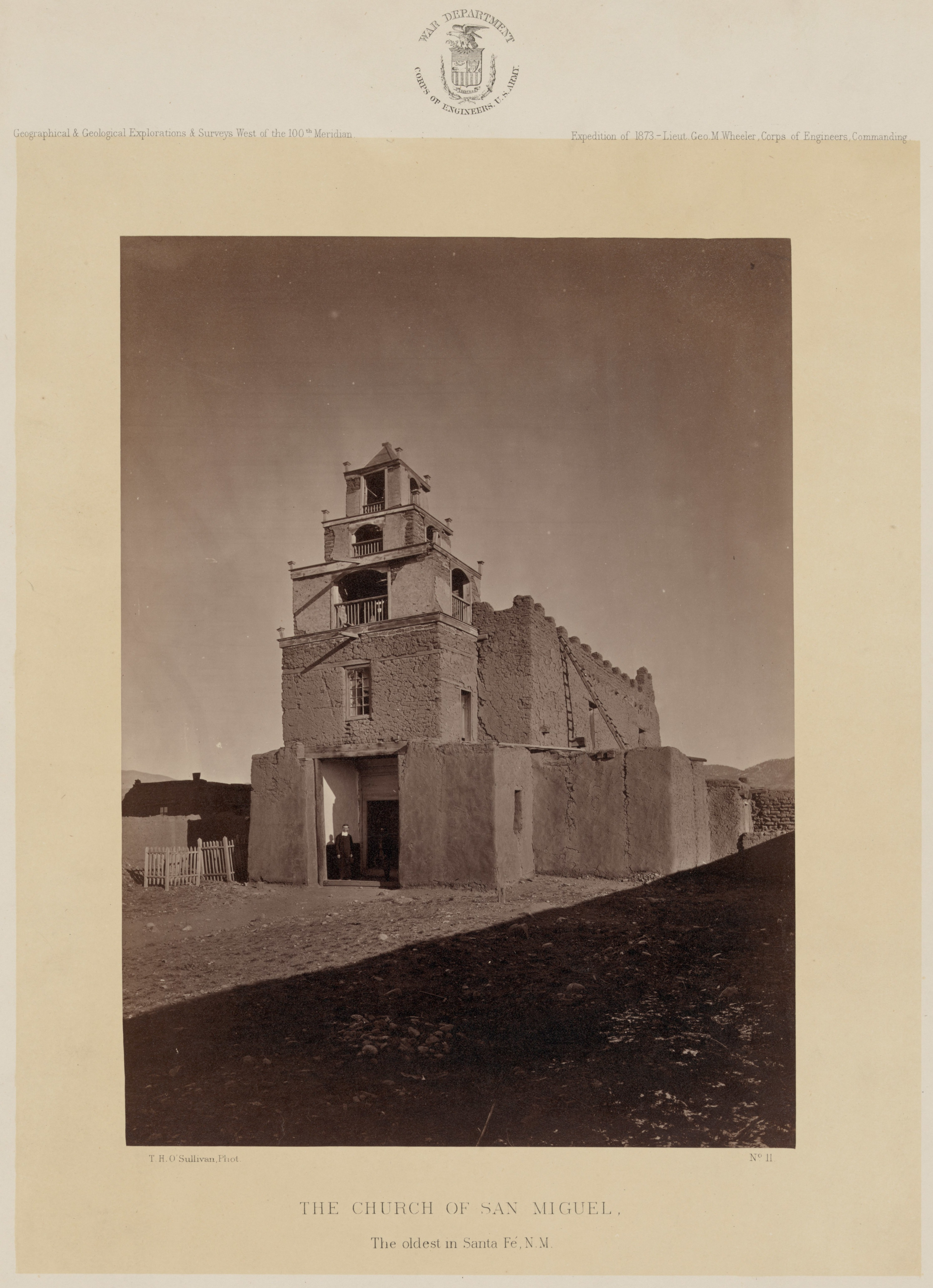
The church as it appeared in the early 1870s

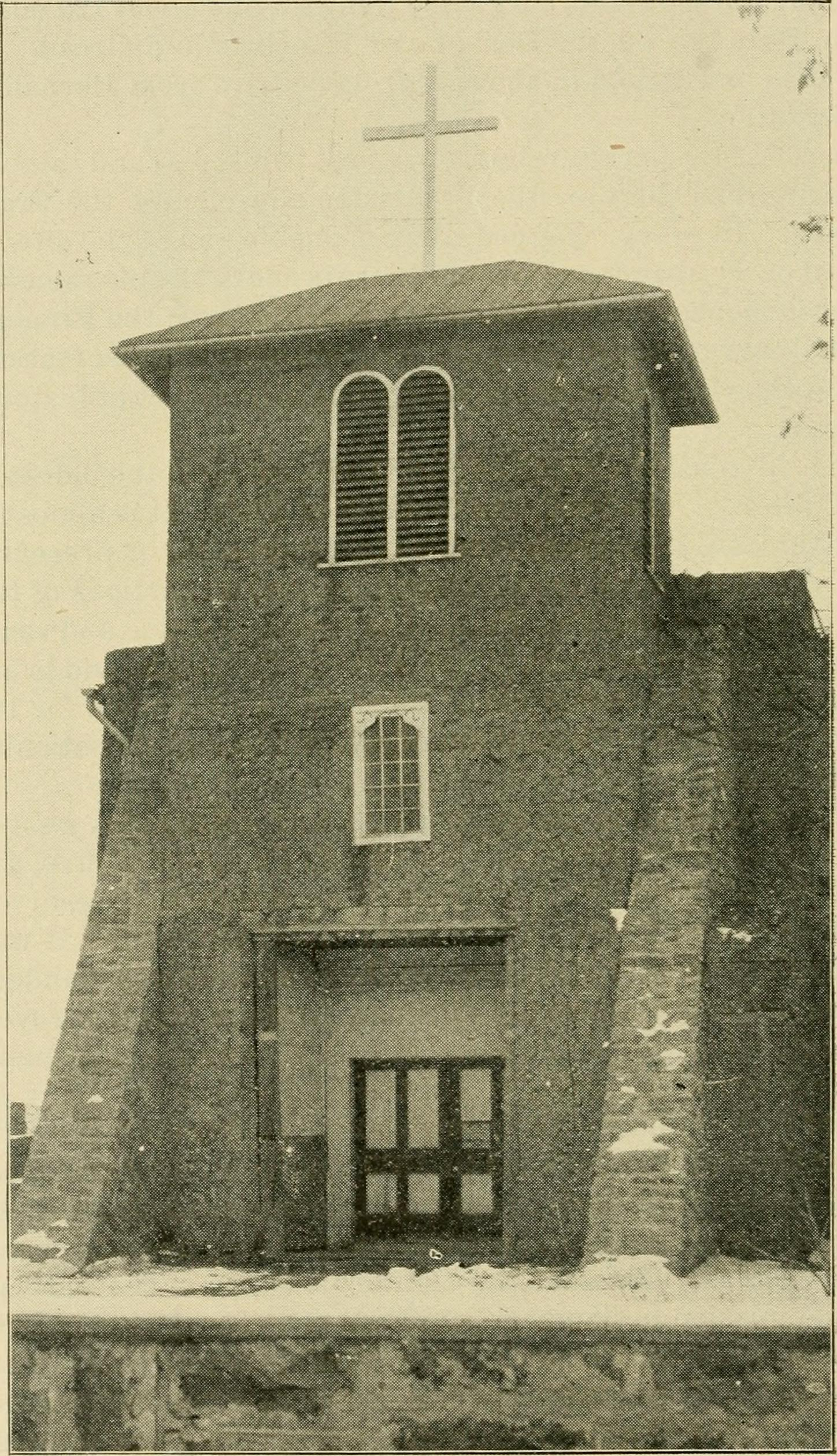
San Miguel Mission in 1904, after being remodeled in the 1880s

The original San Miguel church was probably built shortly after the founding of Santa Fe in 1610 and was the first church in the new settlement. It was built across the Santa Fe River from the villa proper in an area referred to as the Barrio de Analco, which was inhabited mainly by native people including some Tlaxcalans who had accompanied the Spanish settlers from Mexico. Since missionary work was a priority for the Spaniards, they built a church to serve this population before building their own Parroquia or parish church near the Plaza. In 1630, Alonso de Benavides reported,

Only it [Santa Fe] lacked the principal thing, which was the church, that which they had being only a poor 'jacal'; because the Friars gave their first attention to building churches for the Indians whom they converted and among whom they lived and labored; and therefore as soon as I became Custodian, I began to build the church and convento, to the honor and glory of God."

The San Miguel Chapel was first mentioned in writing in 1628, indicating it was in use at that point. The original San Miguel Chapel was probably smaller than the present structure, with a rectangular apse, a slightly raised sanctuary, and a simple front elevation with no towers. The surviving foundations were excavated and studied by Bruce Ellis and Stanley Stubbs in 1955. In 1640, escalating conflict between Governor Luis de Rosas and the Franciscan missionaries who ran the church in New Mexico led to all of the Franciscans being expelled from Santa Fe, and the mission was partially or completely dismantled. De Rosas was later jailed and the Franciscans were able to return and rebuild the mission. It was damaged again in the Pueblo Revolt of 1680, when the Pueblo people rose up in a coordinated rebellion to drive the Spanish from New Mexico.

When Diego de Vargas led the Spanish back into Santa Fe in 1692, he found the mission burned but reparable. According to his official report, dated December 18, 1693,

I went to examine the church or hermitage which was used as a parish church for the Mexican Indians who lived in the said town under the title of the invocation of their patron, the Archangel San Miguel. And having examined it, though of small dimensions, and not for the accommodation of a great number; notwithstanding, on account of said inclemency of the weather, and the urgency of having a church in which should be celebrated the Divine Office and the Holy Sacrifice of the Mass... [I] recognized that it is proper to roof said walls, and to white-wash and repair its windows in a manner that shall be the quickest, easiest, briefest, and least laborious to said natives.

The parties alluded to being present, I ordered that they should send said natives; having taken measures in respect to the lumber aforesaid, and having offered them axes, and mules for its fast conveyance, that those who were adapted to hewing said lumber should do so, and that those who were fit for the trade of masons in repairing said walls should be ordered in like manner, and that I, on my part, should have the Spaniards whom I had with me to assist thereat.

A more thorough rebuilding was undertaken in 1710 under the direction of Don Agustín Flores Vergara, who is named on the main beam supporting the choir loft along with the governor at the time, the Marquis de la Peñuela. The church was probably rebuilt on the same foundations and had the same layout as the earlier building, except that the apse was apparently changed from rectangular to trapezoidal. San Miguel was visited in 1776 by Fray Atanasio Domínguez, who wrote a thorough description:

It is of adobes, the walls not very thick, single-naved, 8 varas [22 feet (6.7 m)] high up to the bed molding, not quite as wide, and 23 varas [63 feet (19 m)] long from the door to the high altar. Its ceiling consists of round beams without corbels, and there are twenty-one as far as a clerestory like those mentioned elsewhere. The choir loft is across the width of the chapel over the main door on fourteen round beams which rest on a heavy cross timber. Its projection, or depth, is 3 1/2 varas [9.6 feet (2.9 m)], and it has a balustrade. There are three windows in this chapel, two on the Epistle side that face south, and one to the west in the choir loft over the main door, which also faces west. The door is squared, set in a wooden frame, has two leaves and no key, but it does have a crossbar. Over the main door is a small arch with a little bell.

At some point after Domínguez' visit, possibly in the 1830s, the present bell tower was added to the front of the church. By the time of the American occupation in 1846, masses were being held in the church only twice a year. The top levels of the tower collapsed during a storm in 1872 and by the 1880s the entire structure was in poor condition. In 1881, the Archdiocese of Santa Fe sold the little-used building to the Christian Brothers who operated the adjacent St. Michael's College. Under their ownership, the church was restored in 1887, rebuilding the bell tower and stabilizing the walls with stone buttresses. This project gave the building a more European appearance, adding arched openings and a pitched metal roof to the front elevation. These elements were later removed in 1955 during the most recent remodeling of the church.

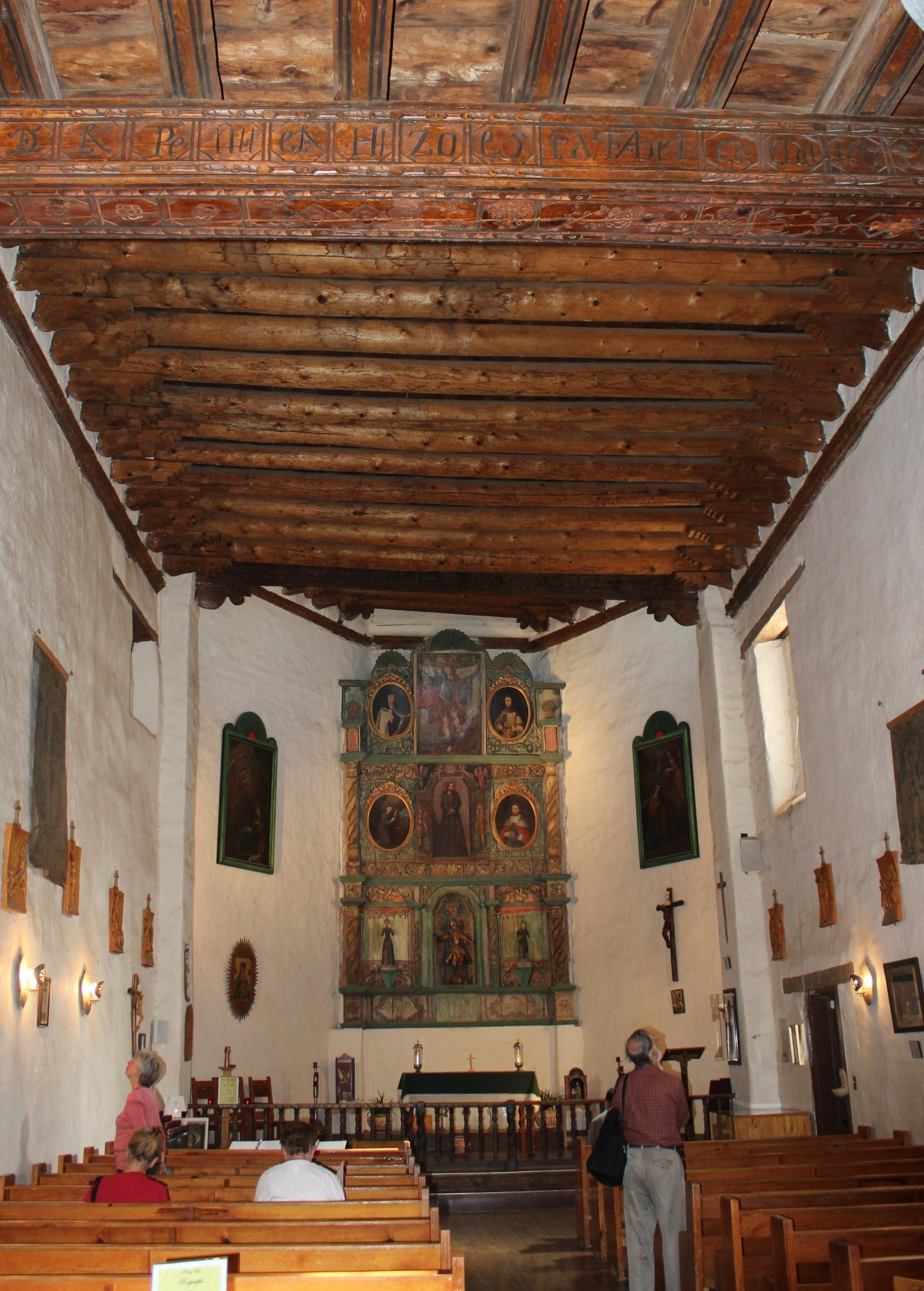
The church interior with part of the inscribed choir loft beam visible at the top

== Architecture ==
San Miguel Mission is constructed from adobe, with a single rectangular nave and a trapezoidal apse. The walls are approximately 5 feet (1.5 m) thick. The church interior is about 24 feet (7.3 m) wide, 70 feet (21 m) long, and 25 feet (7.6 m) high. The ceiling is supported by wooden vigas, of which two are square and are thought to date to 1710, while the remainder are round and are newer replacements. A clerestory above the sanctuary and a high window in the south wall provide light inside the church. The choir loft is supported by a heavy, corbeled beam spanning the width of the nave which in turn supports 13 perpendicular carved beams. The main beam is inscribed:

El Señor Marquez de la Peñuela hizo esta fabrica
El Alferes Real Don Agustin Flores Vergara su criado
Año 1710

Translation:

The Marquis de la Peñuela erected this building
The Royal Ensign Don Agustin Flores Vergara, his servant
The year 1710

The front elevation of the church faces west and has a central bell tower with a single small window and a larger open void directly above the main entrance. The building is supported by five stone buttresses added in 1887, two on the front and three on the north side. To the south of the nave are a sacristy, robing room, and storage and residence areas.

== Reredos ==
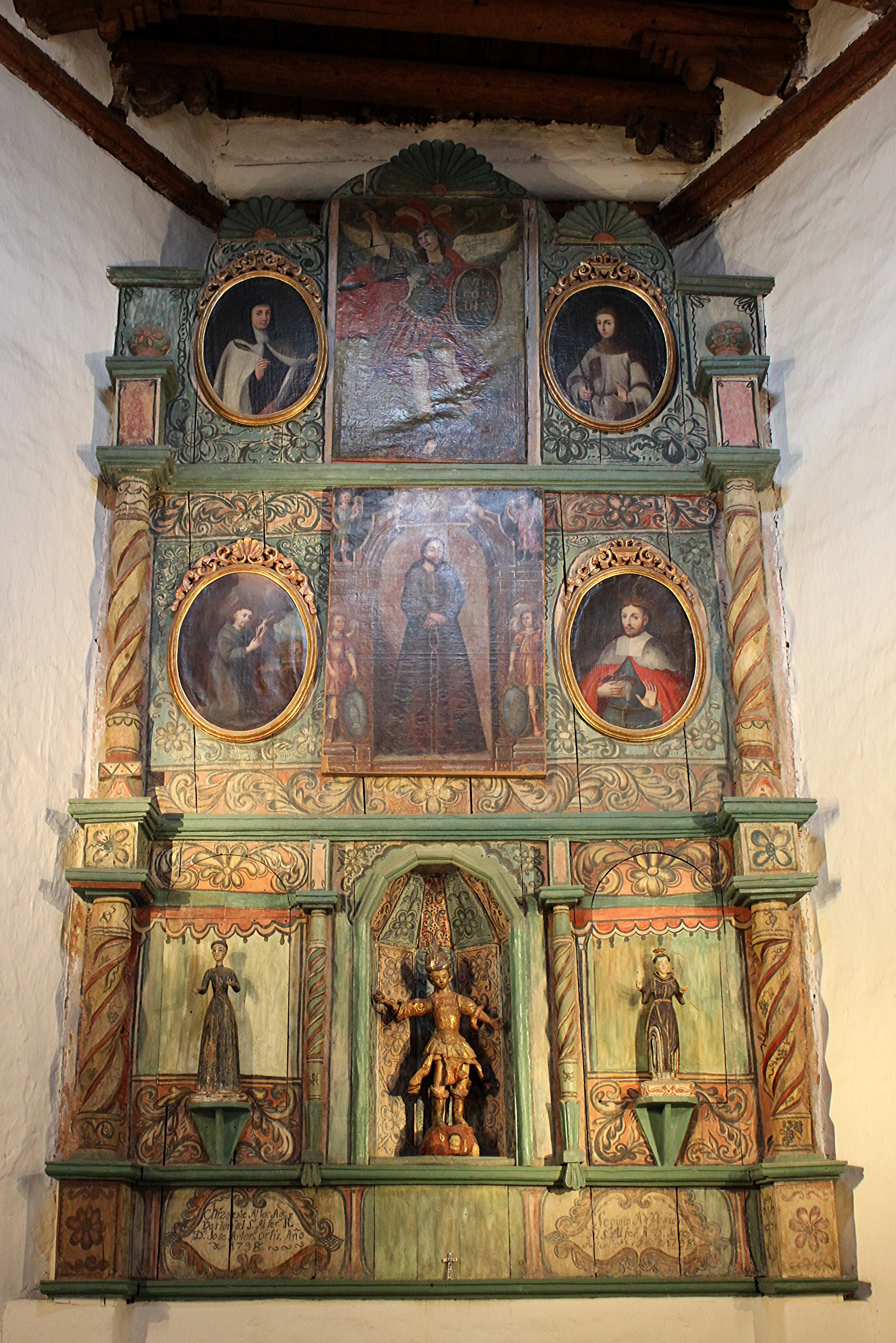
The reredos, dated 1798

The wooden reredos or altar screen dates to 1798 and is said to be the work of an unnamed artisan known as the "Laguna Santero" who was active in New Mexico between 1796 and 1808. The screen is flanked by large Solomonic columns. A niche in the center of the reredos, with its own small pair of columns, contains a wooden statue of St. Michael the Archangel wielding a sword. The statue originated in Mexico in 1709 and has been in place at least since 1776, when it was mentioned in Domínguez' inventory of the church. Directly above the statue is a large painting of Jesus from the mid-18th century which was found behind the altar screen during the 1955 renovations. At the top center is a 1745 painting of St. Michael attributed to Bernardo de Miera y Pacheco. Around these two paintings are four oval oil paintings on canvas, which are Mexican and date to the early 18th century. Clockwise from top left, they depict St. Teresa of Ávila, St. Gertrude, St. Louis, and St. Francis of Assisi. The entire reredos was painted over at some point but was later restored.

On either side of the reredos are two paintings depicting the Annunciation, "believed to be the work of one of the disciples of Bartolomé Esteban Murillo". In the early 20th century, these paintings were falsely attributed to Cimabue and claimed to date from 1287.

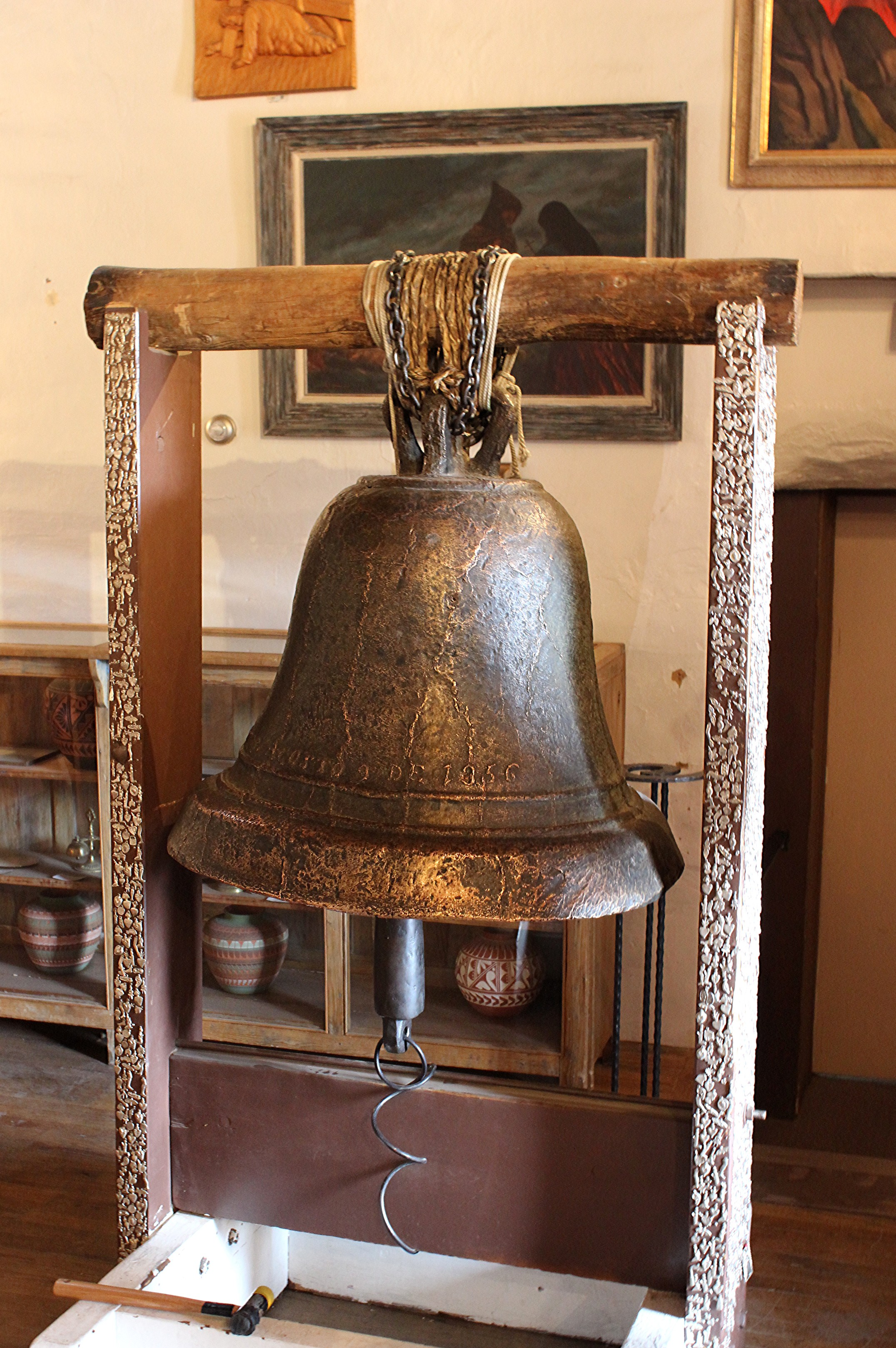
The San Miguel bell

== Bell ==
Another notable object associated with the church is the bell that hung in the bell tower prior to 1872, which is still on display inside the building. The bell is mostly copper, weighs 780 pounds (350 kg), and bears the legend

San José ruega por nosotros
Agosto 9 de 1356

Translation:

Saint Joseph pray for us
August 9, 1356

The unlikely date of 1356 attracted attention from historians and the public. The San Miguel bell and the similar Maria Josefa bell, dated 1355, were claimed to be the oldest bells in the United States. This was debunked in 1914 by Benjamin Read, who located an elderly man who remembered the bell being cast in Santa Fe and confirmed that the correct date was 1856, not 1356. Furthermore, the bell is stylistically dissimilar to actual 14th-century church bells, which would have been inscribed in Latin and dated using Roman numerals. The unlikelihood of two such large and heavy bells being brought from Europe when locally made bells were available has also been noted. Casting defects were probably responsible for the 8 appearing as a 3.

== See also ==
- List of churches in the Roman Catholic Archdiocese of Santa Fe
- Oldest buildings in the United States
- Oldest churches in the United States
- Camino Real de Tierra Adentro
