= Montelupo =

Montelupo may refer to:

== Places ==
- Domagnano, San Marino, formerly known as Montelupo after its coat of arms
- Montelupo Albese, Piedmont, Italy
- Montelupo Fiorentino, Tuscany, Italy
  - Montelupo Observatory, an astronomic observatory in Montelupo Fiorentino

== People ==
- Baccio da Montelupo (1469 – c. 1523), Italian sculptor
- Raffaello da Montelupo (c. 1504 – c. 1566), Italian sculptor and architect, son of Baccio

== Other uses ==
- 7198 Montelupo, a minor planet
- GP Montelupo, former cycling race in Montelupo Fiorentino
