= Albese =

Albese may refer to:

- A.S.D. Albese Calcio, an Italian football club based in Alba, Piedmont
- Albese con Cassano, an Italian municipality of the Province of Como, Lombardy
- Montelupo Albese, an Italian municipality of the Province of Cuneo, Piedmont

== See also ==
- Alba (disambiguation)
