= Governor Chacón =

Governor Chacón may refer to:

- José María Chacón (1749–1833), last Spanish Governor of Trinidad from 1783 to 1797
- Fernando Chacón, Governor of New Mexico from 1794 to 1804
- Jose Chacón Medina Salazar y Villaseñor, Governor of New Mexico from 1707 to 1712
