= Bosia =

Bosia may refer to:

== Places ==
Italy

- Bosia, Piedmont, a comune in the Province of Cuneo

Romania

- Bosia, a village in Vultureni Commune, Bacău County
- Bosia, a village in Ungheni Commune, Iaşi County, and the former name of the commune until 1996
