= Cravanzana =

- Comune
- Comune di Cravanzana
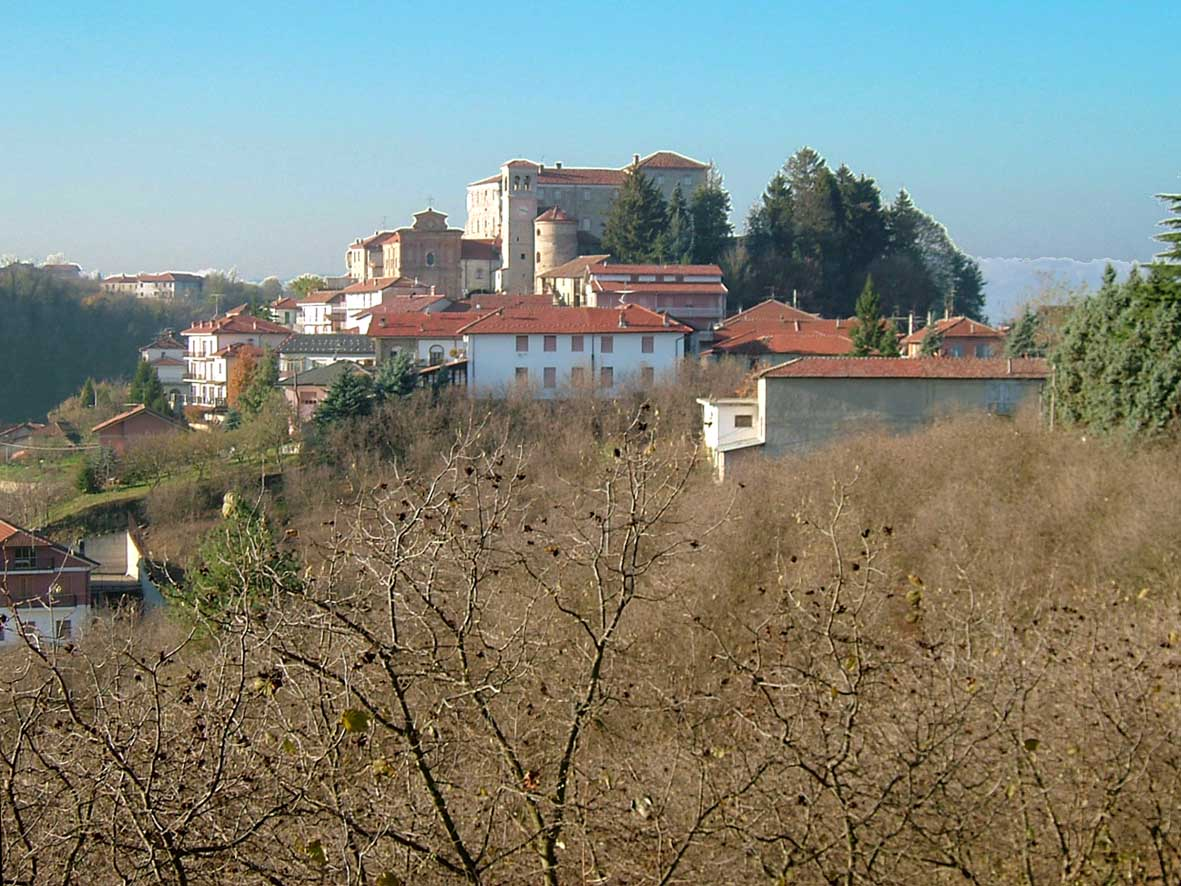

- Location within Italy Location within Piedmont
- Coordinates: 44°35′N 8°8′E
- Country: Italy
- Region: Piedmont
- Province: Cuneo (CN)

Government
  - Mayor: Gianluca Fresia

Area
  - Total: 8.2 km^{2} (3.2 sq mi)
- Elevation: 585 m (1,919 ft)

Population (30 November 2017)
  - Total: 383
  - Density: 47/km^{2} (120/sq mi)
- Time zone: UTC+1 (CET)
  - Summer (DST): UTC+2 (CEST)
- Postal code: 12050
- Dialing code: 0173

Cravanzana is a comune (municipality) in the Province of Cuneo in the Italian region Piedmont, located about 60 kilometres (37 mi) southeast of Turin and about 50 kilometres (31 mi) northeast of Cuneo.

Cravanzana borders the following municipalities: Arguello, Bosia, Cerreto Langhe, Feisoglio, Lequio Berria, and Torre Bormida.
