= Francisco Gomes (governor) =

Portuguese military leader

Francisco Gomez Vicente

11th Spanish Governor of New Mexico
- In office 1641–1642
- Preceded by: Juan Flores de Sierra y Valdés
- Succeeded by: Alonso de Pacheco de Herédia

Personal details
- Born: 1576 Coima, Portugal
- Died: 1656–1657 Santa Fe, New Mexico
- Profession: military and political

Francisco Gomez Vicente (born 1576, died in either 1656 or 1657) was a prominent Portuguese military leader who held the charge of acting governor of New Mexico between 1641 and 1642. He was among the first settlers of Santa Fe, New Mexico.

== Early life ==
Francisco Gomes was born in 1576 in Villa de Coima, Portugal. He was the son of Manuel Gomes and Ana Vicente and became an orphan at an early age. He was then raised in Lisbon by his only brother, Franciscan Alvaro (or Alonso) Gomes, who worked as a high sheriff of the Holy Office of the Inquisition. His family was probably of noble origin. Gomes resided for a time in Madrid at the house of Alonso de Oñate (who was brother of Juan de Oñate). This placed him in the court of King Philip II during the king's illness. Gomes probably lived there until the death of king in 1598.

== Career ==
In 1604, De Oñate took him to Mexico City. There, Gomes contributed to the formation of a colony led by De Oñate. The next year, Gomes moved to New Mexico and joined the military. He ascended to the position of sergeant and eventually became the most prominent military officers in the colony. In 1610, during his military service, he co-founded the town of Santa Fe where he and his family resided. He was also a rancher and a farmer.

In 1641, the governor of New Mexico, Juan Flores de Sierra, appointed him as interim governor while De Sierra was on his deathbed. Although Gomes was rejected by the Board of New Mexico, he continued to govern. He finished his term in 1642. Gomes had a falling out with some of the friars who had power, causing political friction. He was accused of having Jewish heritage. It was believed that he secretly practiced Judaism. He died in Santa Fe around 1656–1657.

== Personal life and legacy ==
Gomes married Ana Robledo Romero in 1626 in San Gabriel. He married her to get land as a dowry. Gomez and Romero had seven children:

- Francisca (a daughter and probably the eldest of their children),
- Francisco (the eldest son, born circa 1628 in Santa Fe),
- Bartolomé (born circa 1639),
- Juan (birth date unknown),
- Andrés (born circa 1643),
- José (born circa 1645),
- Ana Gómes Robledo (birth date unknown).

Gomes' son, Francisco, was a sergeant, and like his father, he was accused of being a Jew. He was incarcerated in a Franciscan friary, and his property was confiscated. However, later he was acquitted in January 1655.

Gomes possessed substantial pasture land. He received land grants in San Juan Pueblo, Taos Pueblo, Tesuque Pueblo and a fourth located south of Isleta Pueblo in San Nicolas de las Barrancas. In addition to his role as an encomendero, Gomes was honored in at least eight village communities, among which were Pecos, New Mexico, Tesuque, and Taos. As a token of his appreciation, Gomes subsidized military campaigns, deployed horses and allocated supplies to Spanish soldiers and their Pueblo Native American allies.

The complaint leveled by the Franciscans against Francisco Gomes reduced the economic and political power of his family (although, later, the family regained its status). Unfortunately, most of the records were lost with the Pueblo Revolt in August 1680.
