= Cerretto Langhe =

Cerreto Langhe
- Comune
- Comune di Cerreto Langhe
- Location within Italy Location within Piedmont
- Coordinates: 44°34′N 8°6′E
- Country: Italy
- Region: Piedmont
- Province: Province of Cuneo (CN)

Area
  - Total: 10.1 km^{2} (3.9 sq mi)

Population (Dec. 2004)
  - Total: 463
  - Density: 45.8/km^{2} (119/sq mi)
- Time zone: UTC+1 (CET)
  - Summer (DST): UTC+2 (CEST)
- Postal code: 12050
- Dialing code: 0173

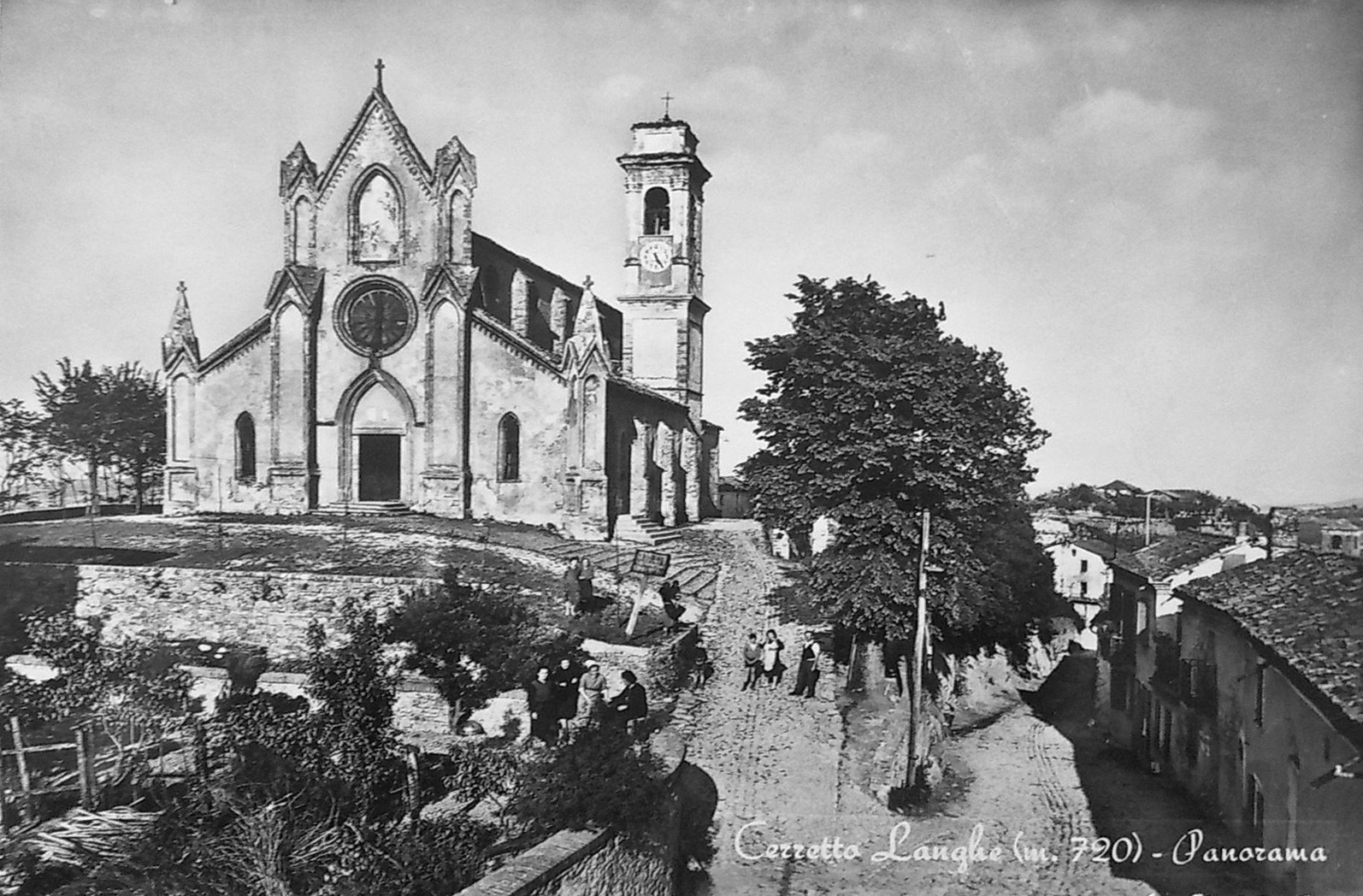
Postcard of Cerreto Langhe

Cerretto Langhe, also Cerreto Langhe, is a comune (municipality) in the Province of Cuneo in the Italian region Piedmont, located about 60 kilometres (37 mi) southeast of Turin and about 50 kilometres (31 mi) northeast of Cuneo. As of 31 December 2004, it had a population of 463 and an area of 10.1 square kilometres (3.9 mi^{2}).

Cerreto Langhe borders the following municipalities: Albaretto della Torre, Arguello, Cravanzana, Feisoglio, Roddino, Serravalle Langhe, and Sinio.

== Demographic evolution ==
Historical population

Year	Pop.	±%
1861	642	—
1871	683	+6.4%
1881	640	−6.3%
1901	695	+8.6%
1911	830	+19.4%

Year	Pop.	±%
1921	777	−6.4%
1931	782	+0.6%
1936	778	−0.5%
1951	740	−4.9%
1961	591	−20.1%

Year	Pop.	±%
1971	441	−25.4%
1981	391	−11.3%
1991	383	−2.0%
2001	469	+22.5%

Source: Data from ISTAT
