= Benevello =

- Comune
- Comune di Benevello
- Location within Italy Location within Piedmont
- Coordinates: 44°38′N 8°6′E
- Country: Italy
- Region: Piedmont
- Province: Province of Cuneo (CN)

Area
  - Total: 5.4 km^{2} (2.1 sq mi)
- Elevation: 671 m (2,201 ft)

Population (Dec. 2004)
  - Total: 451
  - Density: 84/km^{2} (220/sq mi)
- Time zone: UTC+1 (CET)
  - Summer (DST): UTC+2 (CEST)
- Postal code: 12050
- Dialing code: 0173

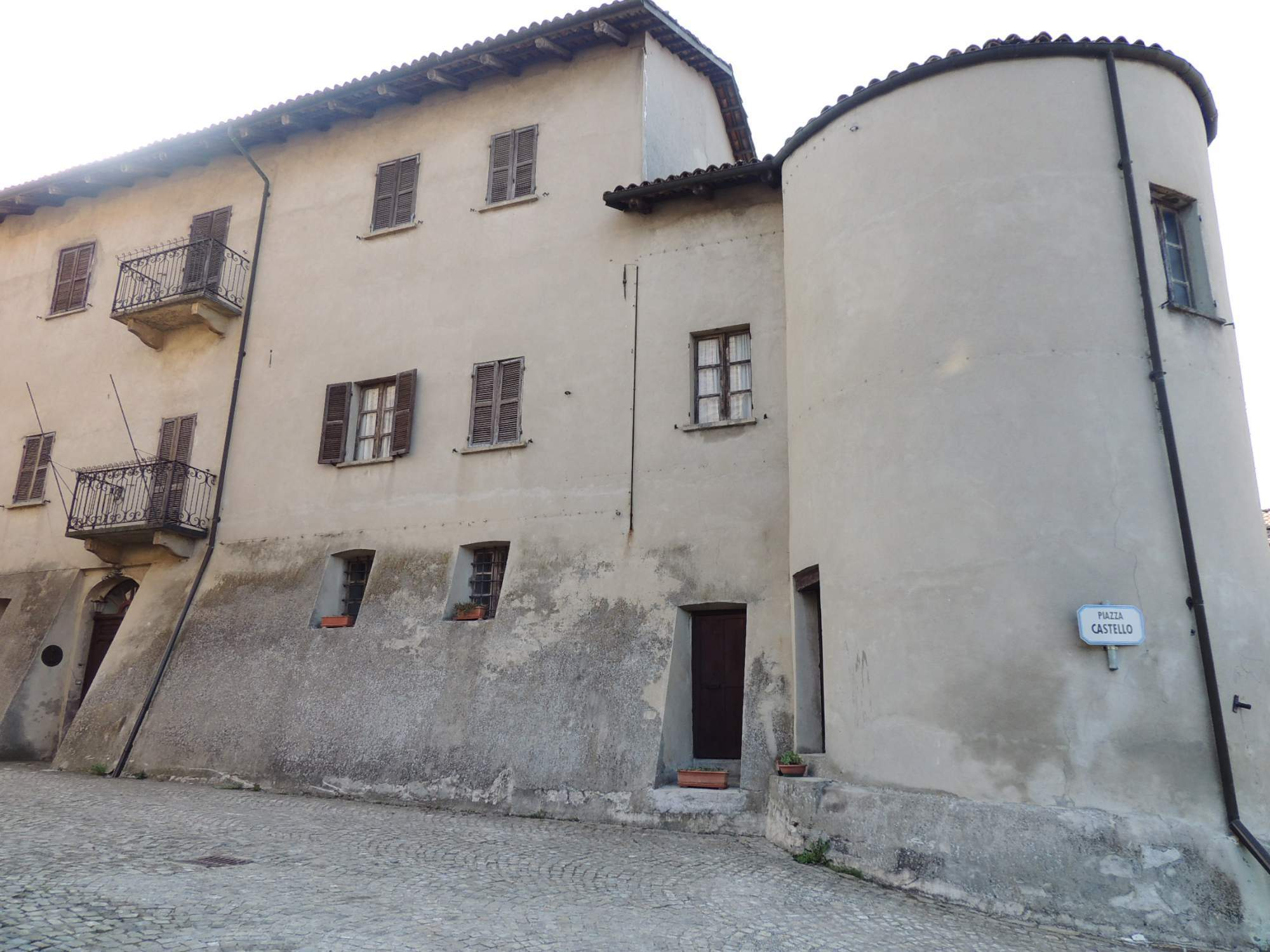
Benevello Castle

Benevello is a comune (municipality) in the Province of Cuneo in the Italian region Piedmont, located about 60 kilometres (37 mi) southeast of Turin and about 50 kilometres (31 mi) northeast of Cuneo. As of 31 December 2004, it had a population of 451 and an area of 5.4 square kilometres (2.1 mi^{2}).

Benevello borders the following municipalities: Alba, Borgomale, Diano d'Alba, Lequio Berria, and Rodello.

== Demographic evolution ==
Historical population

Year	Pop.	±%
1861	378	—
1871	426	+12.7%
1881	440	+3.3%
1901	523	+18.9%
1911	506	−3.3%

Year	Pop.	±%
1921	537	+6.1%
1931	545	+1.5%
1936	531	−2.6%
1951	489	−7.9%
1961	345	−29.4%

Year	Pop.	±%
1971	356	+3.2%
1981	366	+2.8%
1991	419	+14.5%
2001	448	+6.9%

Source: Data from ISTAT
