= Serravalle Langhe =

- Comune
- Comune di Serravalle Langhe
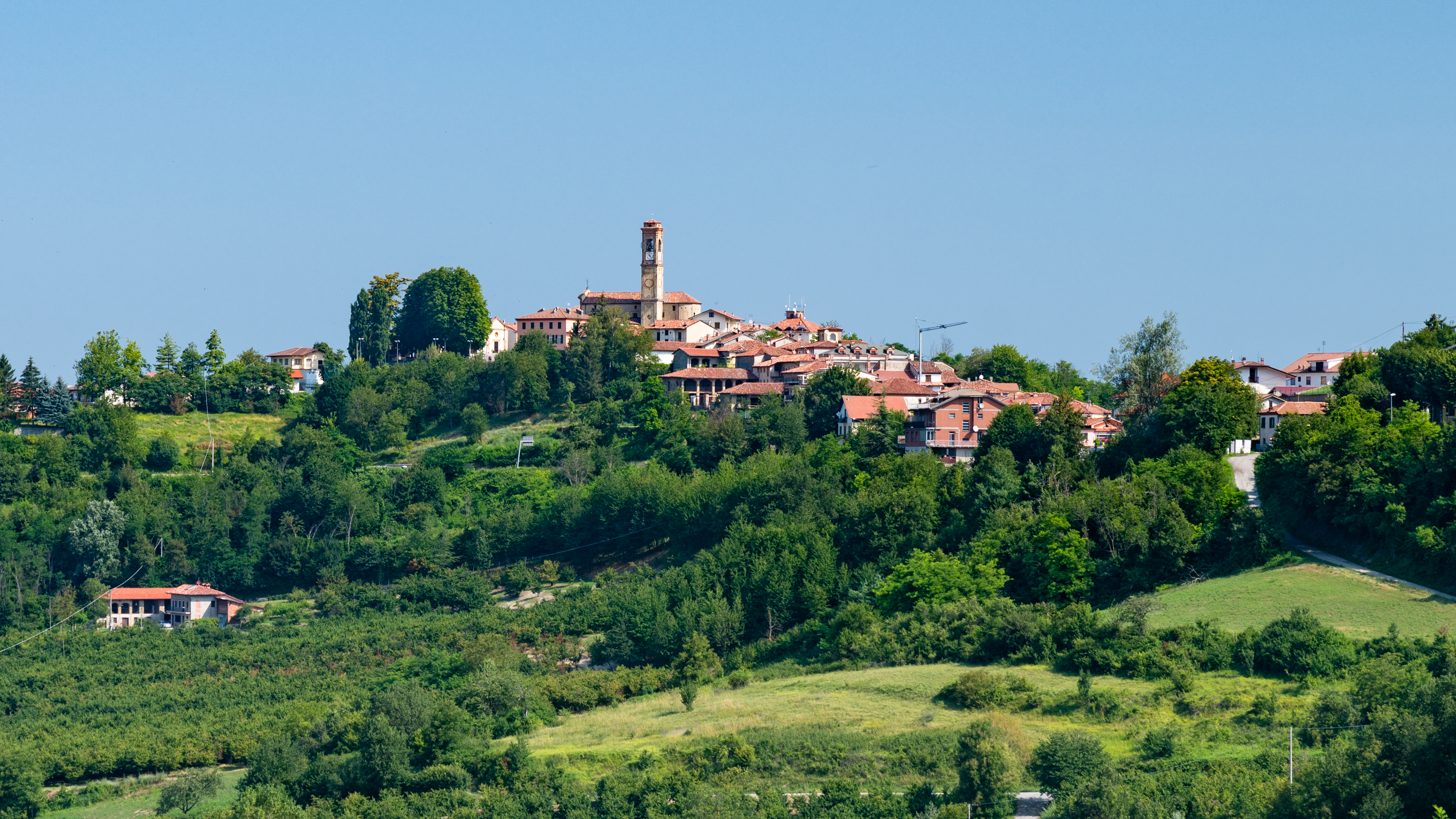

- Location within Italy Location within Piedmont
- Coordinates: 44°34′N 8°4′E
- Country: Italy
- Region: Piedmont
- Province: Province of Cuneo (CN)
- Frazioni: Villa

Area
  - Total: 9.1 km^{2} (3.5 sq mi)

Population (Dec. 2004)
  - Total: 340
  - Density: 37/km^{2} (97/sq mi)
- Time zone: UTC+1 (CET)
  - Summer (DST): UTC+2 (CEST)
- Postal code: 12050
- Dialing code: 0173

Serravalle Langhe is a comune (municipality) in the Province of Cuneo in the Italian region Piedmont, located about 60 kilometres (37 mi) southeast of Turin and about 45 kilometres (28 mi) northeast of Cuneo. As of 31 December 2004, it had a population of 340 and an area of 9.1 square kilometres (3.5 mi^{2}).

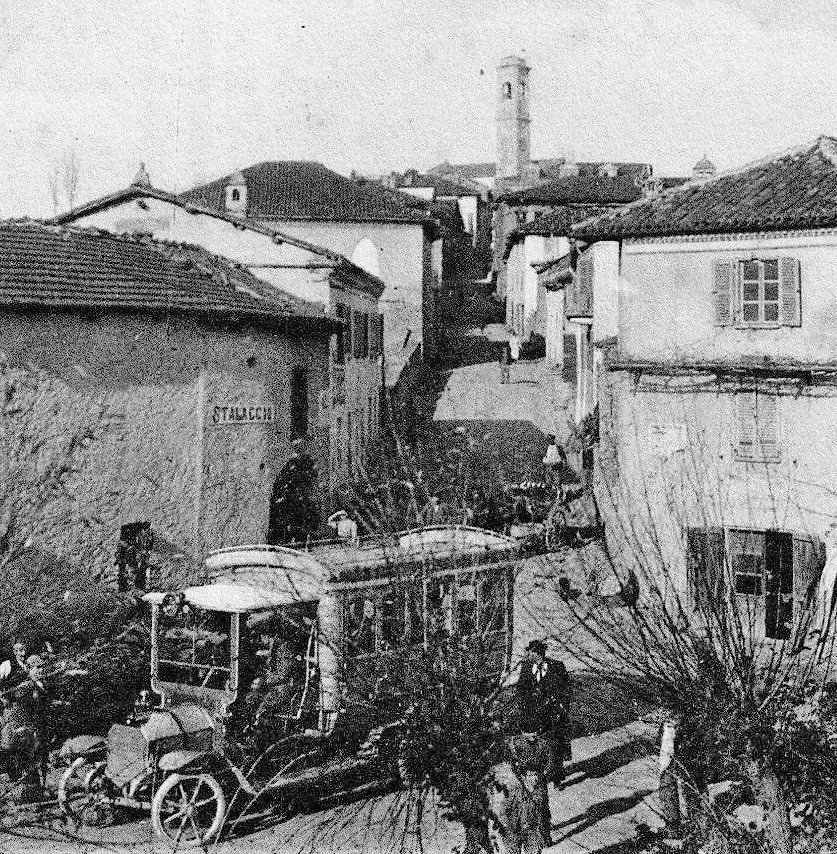
Serravelle Langhe

The municipality of Serravalle Langhe contains the frazione (subdivision) Villa.

Serravalle Langhe borders the following municipalities: Bossolasco, Cerreto Langhe, Cissone, Feisoglio, and Roddino.

== Demographic evolution ==
Historical population

Year	Pop.	±%
1861	661	—
1871	639	−3.3%
1881	610	−4.5%
1901	720	+18.0%
1911	693	−3.7%

Year	Pop.	±%
1921	744	+7.4%
1931	746	+0.3%
1936	714	−4.3%
1951	636	−10.9%
1961	499	−21.5%

Year	Pop.	±%
1971	378	−24.2%
1981	342	−9.5%
1991	318	−7.0%
2001	352	+10.7%

Source: Data from ISTAT
