= Albaretto della Torre =

- Comune
- Comune di Albaretto della Torre
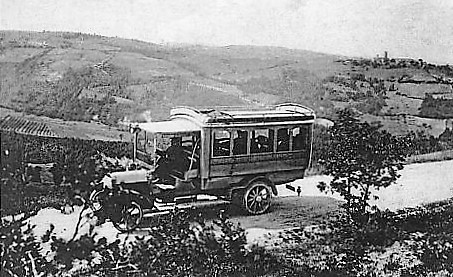

- Location of Albaretto della Torre in Italy Albaretto della Torre (Piedmont)
- Coordinates: 44°36′N 8°4′E
- Country: Italy
- Region: Piedmont
- Province: Cuneo (CN)

Government
  - Mayor: Ivan Borgna

Area
  - Total: 4.59 km^{2} (1.77 sq mi)
- Elevation: 672 m (2,205 ft)

Population (30 November 2017)
  - Total: 229
  - Density: 49.9/km^{2} (129/sq mi)
- Demonym: Albarettesi
- Time zone: UTC+1 (CET)
  - Summer (DST): UTC+2 (CEST)
- Postal code: 12050
- Dialing code: 0173
- Patron saint: St. Sebastian
- Saint day: 20 January
- Website: Official website

Albaretto della Torre is a comune (municipality) in the Province of Cuneo in the Italian region Piedmont, located about 60 kilometres (37 mi) southeast of Turin and about 50 kilometres (31 mi) northeast of Cuneo.

Albaretto della Torre borders the following municipalities: Arguello, Cerreto Langhe, Lequio Berria, Rodello, and Sinio.
