= Cissone =

- Comune
- Comune di Cissone
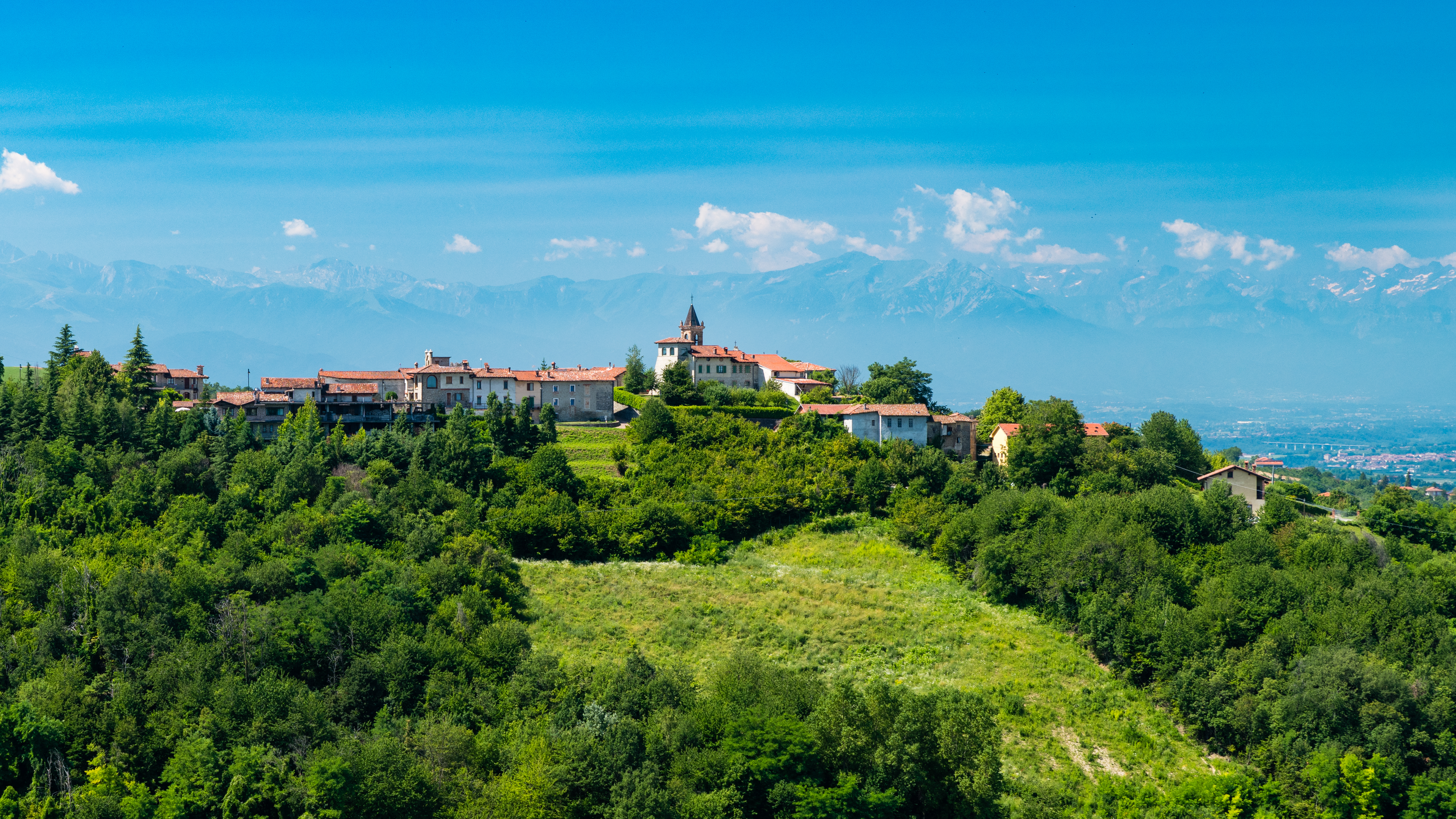

- Location within Italy Location within Piedmont
- Coordinates: 44°34′N 8°2′E
- Country: Italy
- Region: Piedmont
- Province: Province of Cuneo (CN)

Area
  - Total: 5.8 km^{2} (2.2 sq mi)

Population (Dec. 2004)
  - Total: 82
  - Density: 14/km^{2} (37/sq mi)
- Time zone: UTC+1 (CET)
  - Summer (DST): UTC+2 (CEST)
- Postal code: 12050
- Dialing code: 0173

Cissone is a comune (municipality) in the Province of Cuneo in the Italian region Piedmont, located about 60 kilometres (37 mi) southeast of Turin and about 45 kilometres (28 mi) northeast of Cuneo. As of 31 December 2004, it had a population of 82 and an area of 5.8 square kilometres (2.2 mi^{2}).

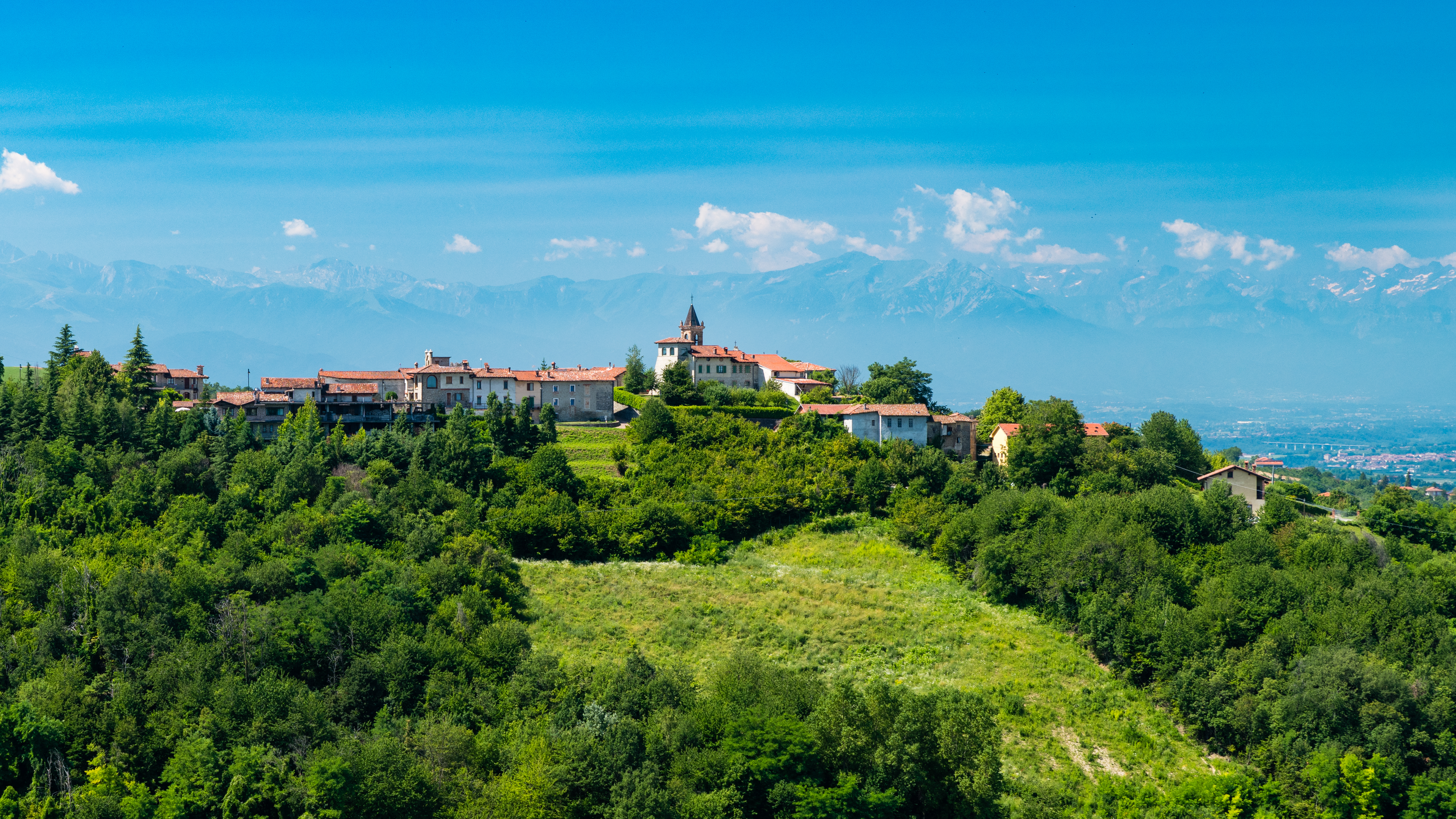
Cissone, Piemonte

Cissone borders the following municipalities: Bossolasco, Dogliani, Roddino, and Serravalle Langhe.

== Demographic evolution ==
Historical population

Year	Pop.	±%
1861	489	—
1871	481	−1.6%
1881	469	−2.5%
1901	518	+10.4%
1911	474	−8.5%

Year	Pop.	±%
1921	460	−3.0%
1931	488	+6.1%
1936	505	+3.5%
1951	376	−25.5%
1961	310	−17.6%

Year	Pop.	±%
1971	219	−29.4%
1981	160	−26.9%
1991	136	−15.0%
2001	100	−26.5%

Source: Data from ISTAT
