= Luis de Guzmán y Figueroa =

Spanish soldier who served as governor of New Mexico

14th Spanish Governor of New Mexico
- In office 1647–1649
- Preceded by: Fernando de Argüello
- Succeeded by: Hernando de Ugarte y la Concha

Personal details
- Profession: Soldier and administrator (governor of New Mexico)

Luis de Guzmán y Figueroa was a Spanish soldier who served as governor of New Mexico from 1647 to 1649.

== Career ==
Luis Guzman y Figueroa was appointed governor of New Mexico on June 18, 1646, by the Viceroy of New Spain, Garcia Sarmiento de Sotomayor, Count of Salvatierra, who at that time occupied that office.

Figueroa arrived in Santa Fe de Nuevo Mexico in 1647, beginning his term, probably in the spring of that year.

During his legislation, Figueroa was apparently successfully bribed by the former governor of the province, Fernando de Arguello, related both the report and accounts of the residence, which were to be handed over by all those who had held a position of official administrator when they left his office. Figueroa was denounced for such crimes to the Spanish Crown by Fray Andrés Suárez. During the governorship of Figueroa, several "conflicts between the civil and religious authorities" were developed. Although the King of Spain attempted to solve in writing, he had no success.

The legal accusations against Figueroa caused him to leave office as governor in 1649, before his term ended. Rumors suggest that Figueroa died in November, 1650, in a duel in Mexico.
