= Sinio =

- Comune
- Comune di Sinio
- Location within Italy Location within Piedmont
- Coordinates: 44°36′N 8°1′E
- Country: Italy
- Region: Piedmont
- Province: Province of Cuneo (CN)

Government
  - Mayor: Sergio Seghesio (Civic List)

Area
  - Total: 8.5 km^{2} (3.3 sq mi)
- Elevation: 357 m (1,171 ft)

Population (1-1-2017)
  - Total: 529
  - Density: 62/km^{2} (160/sq mi)
- Time zone: UTC+1 (CET)
  - Summer (DST): UTC+2 (CEST)
- Postal code: 12050
- Dialing code: 0173

Sinio is a comune (municipality) in the Province of Cuneo in the Italian region Piedmont, located about 60 kilometres (37 mi) southeast of Turin and about 45 kilometres (28 mi) northeast of Cuneo. As of 1 January 2017, it had a population of 529 and an area of 8.5 square kilometres (3.3 mi^{2}).

Sinio borders the following municipalities: Albaretto della Torre, Cerreto Langhe, Montelupo Albese, Roddino, Rodello, and Serralunga d'Alba.

== Demographic evolution ==
Historical population

Year	Pop.	±%
1861	716	—
1871	760	+6.1%
1881	801	+5.4%
1901	948	+18.4%
1911	964	+1.7%

Year	Pop.	±%
1921	988	+2.5%
1931	1,018	+3.0%
1936	1,000	−1.8%
1951	777	−22.3%
1961	594	−23.6%

Year	Pop.	±%
1971	505	−15.0%
1981	422	−16.4%
1991	483	+14.5%
2001	461	−4.6%

Source: Data from ISTAT
