= Juan Flores de Sierra =

10th Spanish Governor of New Mexico

Juan Flores de Sierra y Valdés

10th Spanish Governor of New Mexico
- In office Spring 1641 – Autumn 1641
- Preceded by: Luis de Rosas
- Succeeded by: Francisco Gomes

Personal details
- Died: Autumn 1641 Santa Fe, Nuevo México (New Mexico)
- Profession: Soldier and Governor of New Mexico

Juan Flores de Sierra y Valdés (died in 1641) was a Spanish soldier who served as Governor of New Mexico in 1641. He was replaced at his death by Francisco Gomes.

== Biography ==
Juan Flores de Sierra joined the Spanish Army in his youth, later on becoming General of the Army.

In 1641, Viceroy Diego López Pacheco made De Sierra the Acting Governor of Santa Fe de Nuevo México. After arriving in Santa Fe, Valdez acted as "Residence's Judge" to previous governor, Luis de Rosas. As such, Valdes investigated the administration of De Rosas, as well as the veracity of the charges that the Franciscans had issued against him (they had several confrontations with De Rosas). The investigation was made under the orders of Viceroy. After the investigation, Valdes imprisoned De Rosas, whose administration he considered harmful to the population.

Initially, Valdez wanted to keep some of the people who had worked with Luis de Rosas in the government of New Mexico in their charges, on the town council of the capital of the province. These people were linked to De Rosas through bonds of friendship, but De Sierra changed his mind when he learned that many of the companions of De Rosas in his council were mestizos. He admitted only Spaniards and criollos in the council, so he replaced them by encomenderos. This new group was close to the Franciscans. The town council was a very important institution in the Spanish America because it represented the population of the governed territory. It sent the population's pleas to the governor, as well as the petitions of the inhabitants of the territory both to the King of Spain and his representative in New Spain. Occasionally, if the Viceroy thought the governor had disobeyed royal orders, the town council could replace the governor in some of its functions. Moreover, the town council could temporarily govern a territory when a governor died without a lieutenant governor to replace him.

The fatigue caused by the long journey (he had traveled "over fifteen hundred miles from Mexico City to Santa Fe") made Valdes sick. He appointed Sergeant Francisco Gomes lieutenant governor in order to continue the investigation of Luis de Rosas. Valdés died in autumn 1641 as the shortest-serving governor of New Mexico (from spring 1641 to autumn 1641).

== Personal life ==
Juan Flores de Sierra had at least one son: Juan Flores de Sierra y Valdes II, who became Melchor's lieutenant in the Californian town of San Diego.
