= Serralunga d'Alba Castle =

Castle in Piedmont, Italy

- Castello di Serralunga d'Alba
- Serralunga d'Alba, Piedmont, Italy
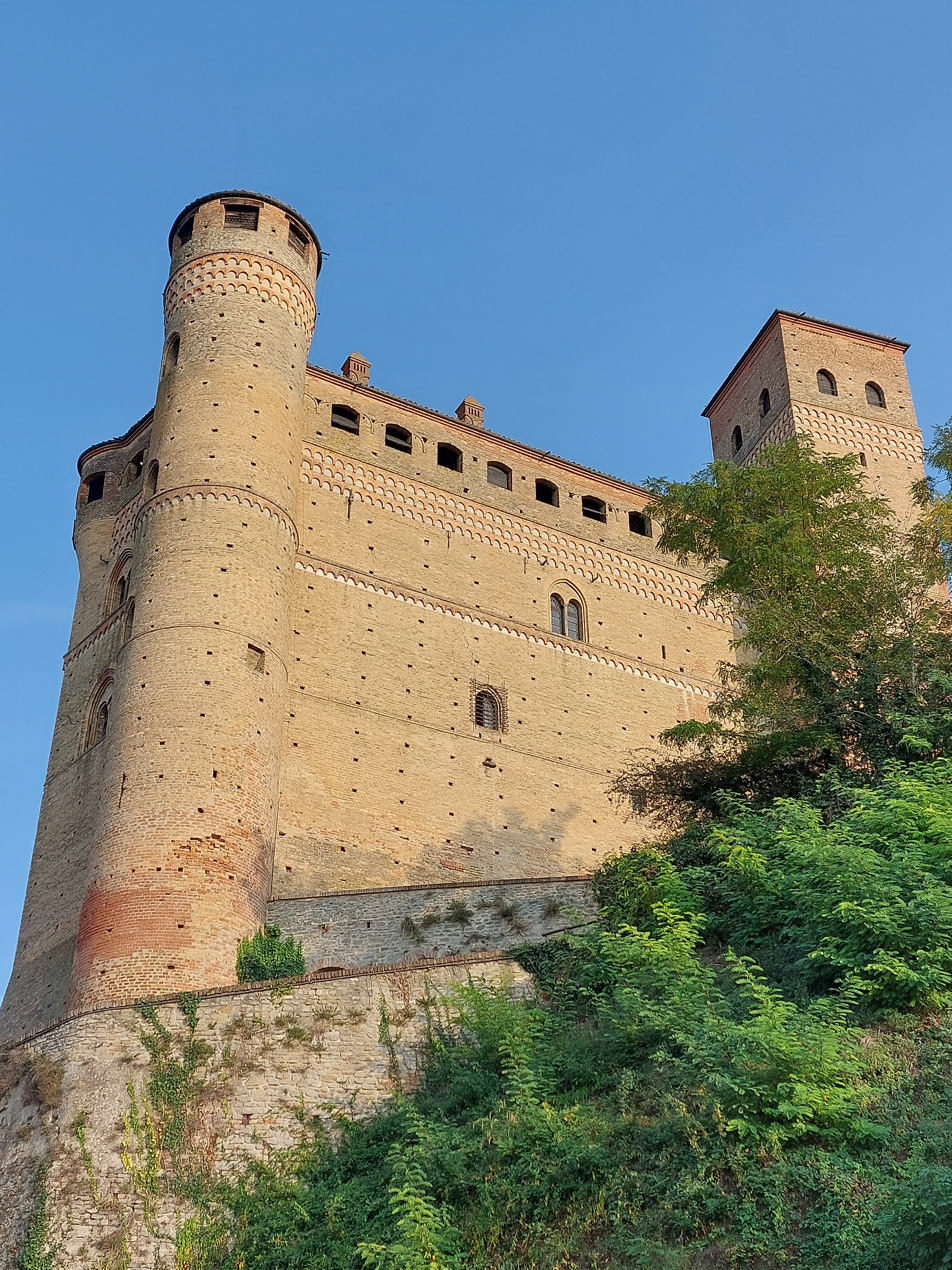
- Serralunga d'Alba Castle in 2023

Site information
- Type: Castle

Location
- Coordinates: 44°36′38.77″N 8°00′00.33″E

Serralunga d'Alba Castle (Italian: Castello di Serralunga d'Alba) is a castle located in Serralunga d'Alba, Piedmont, Italy.

== History ==
Originally, in the 12th century, the site was occupied by a watchtower belonging to the local lords, descendants of Bonifacio del Vasto. After the fief passed to Manfredo of Saluzzo in 1190, the Falletti family of Barolo acquired it in and decided to demolish the pre-existing tower in 1340 to build the current castle under Pietrino and his son Goffredo II. Unlike many other fortresses, the building underwent very few modifications over the centuries, preserving its original medieval structure.

Purchased by the state in 1949, the castle underwent major restoration work to ensure its preservation. Since 2015, it has been managed by the Regional Directorate of Museums of Piedmont, which oversees its promotion and public access.

== Description ==
The castle is considered one of the best-preserved examples of a 14th-century noble castle in Piedmont. It stands in a commanding hilltop position overlooking the village of Serralunga d'Alba and the vineyards of the Langhe.

The castle consists of several architecturally significant parts. The Palacium, an imposing elongated structure with large overlapping halls, is flanked by a cylindrical tower, a square tower, and a chapel decorated with 15th-century frescoes depicting the Martyrdom of Saint Catherine of Alexandria.

== Gallery ==
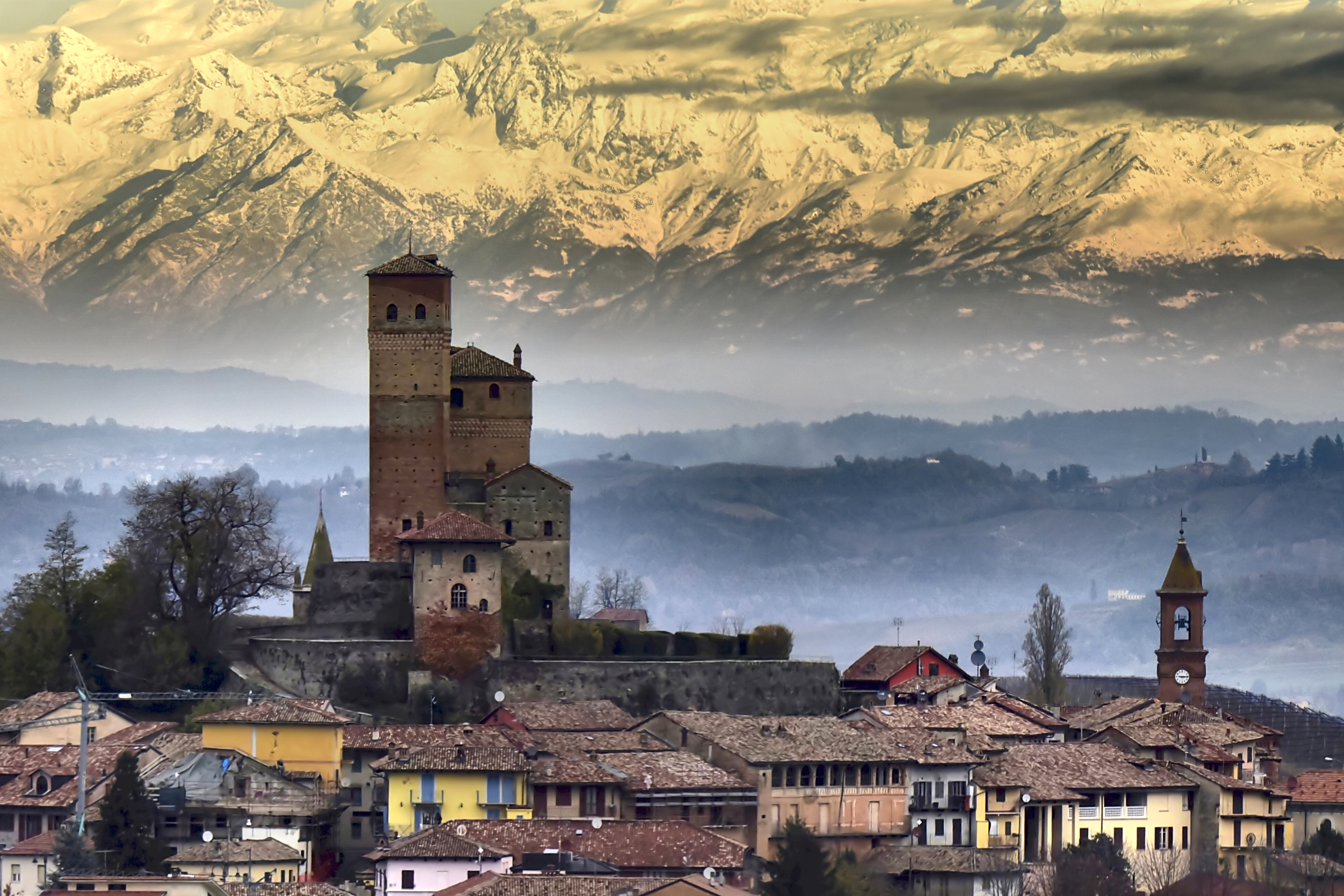

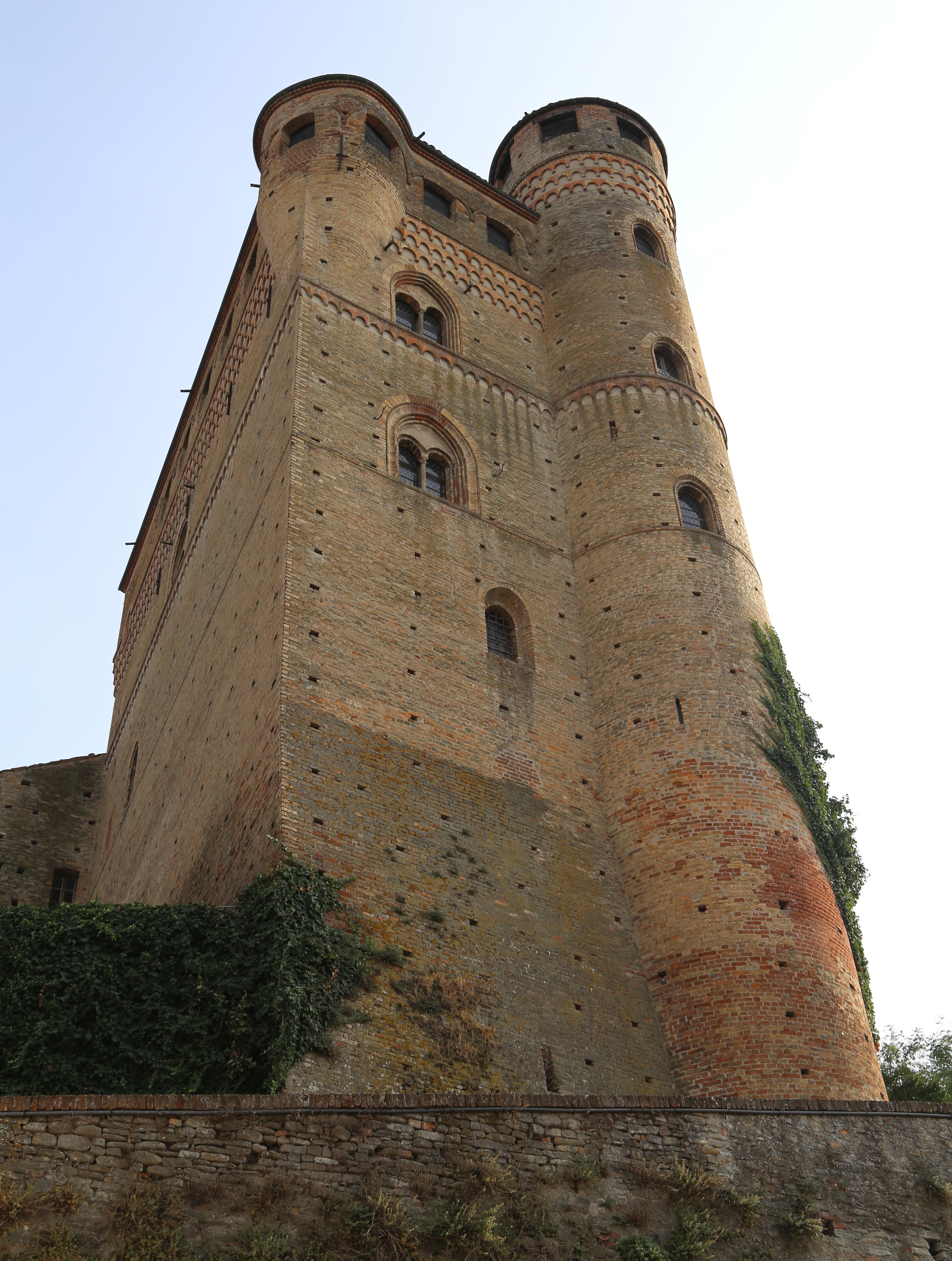

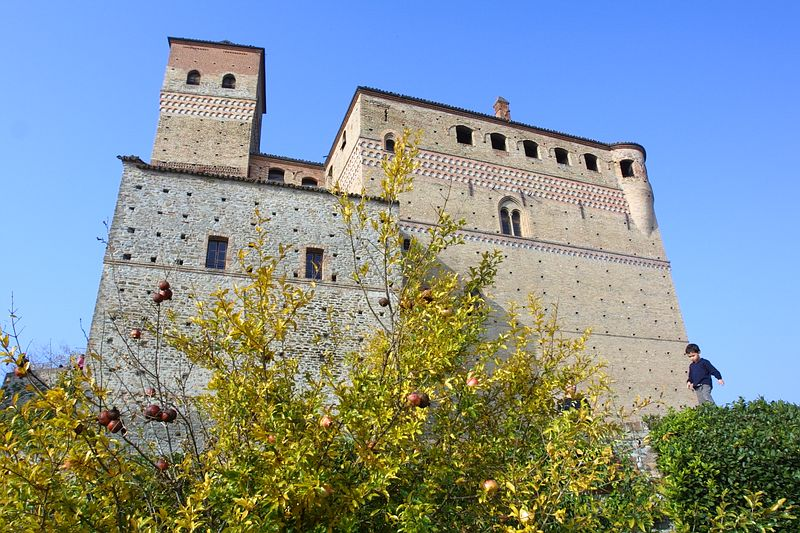
