= Rodello =

- Comune
- Comune di Rodello
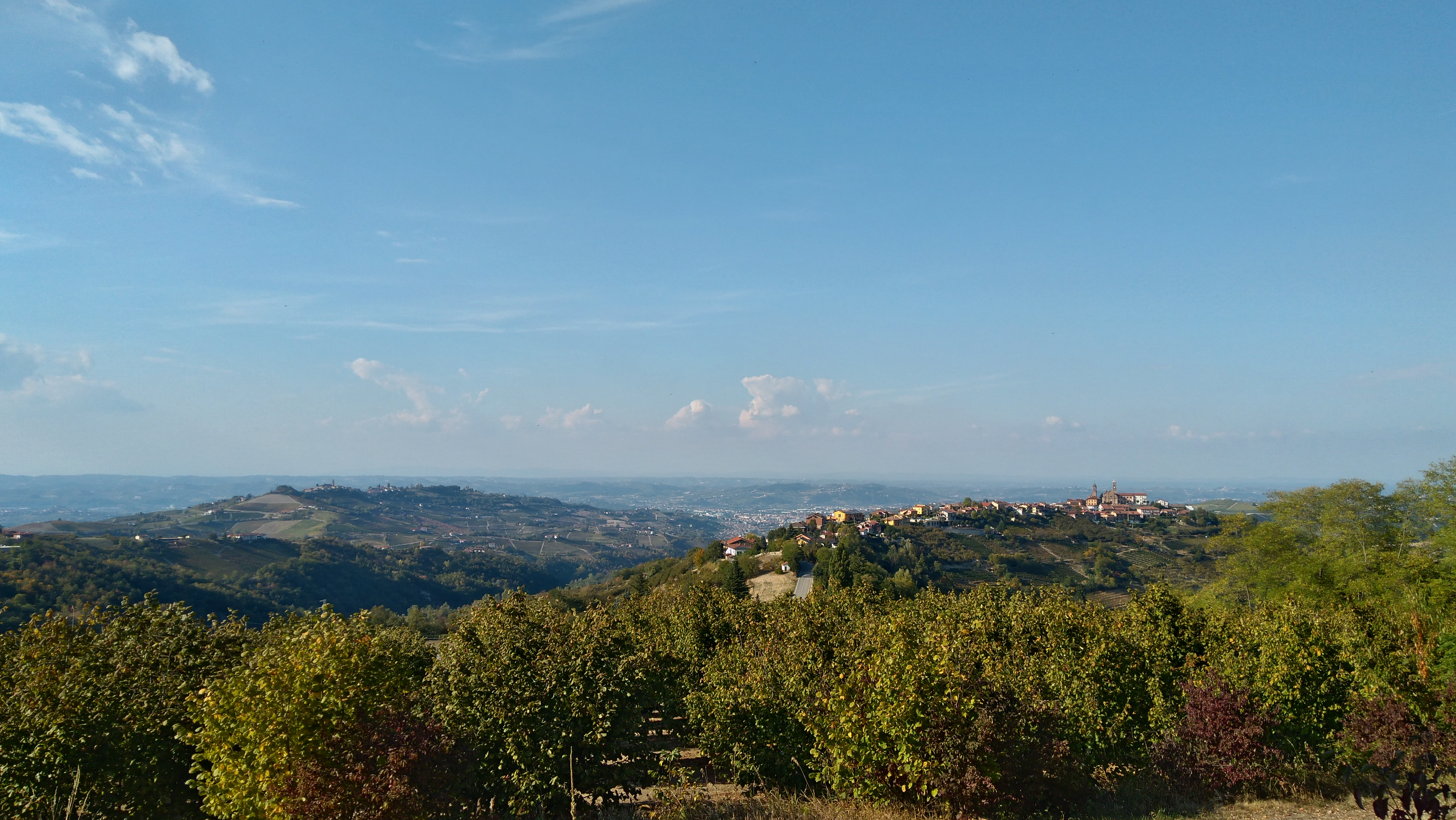
- A view of Rodello

- Coat of arms

- Location within Italy Location within Piedmont
- Coordinates: 44°38′N 8°3′E
- Country: Italy
- Region: Piedmont
- Province: Cuneo (CN)

Government
  - Mayor: Walter Giribaldi

Area
  - Total: 8.8 km^{2} (3.4 sq mi)
- Elevation: 537 m (1,762 ft)

Population (31 December 2010)
  - Total: 986
  - Density: 110/km^{2} (290/sq mi)
- Time zone: UTC+1 (CET)
  - Summer (DST): UTC+2 (CEST)
- Postal code: 12050
- Dialing code: 0173

Rodello is a comune (municipality) in the Province of Cuneo in the Italian region Piedmont, located about 60 kilometres (37 mi) southeast of Turin and about 50 kilometres (31 mi) northeast of Cuneo.

Rodello borders the following municipalities: Albaretto della Torre, Benevello, Diano d'Alba, Lequio Berria, Montelupo Albese, and Sinio.
