= Lequio Berria =

- Comune
- Comune di Lequio Berria
- Location within Italy Location within Piedmont
- Coordinates: 44°36′N 8°6′E
- Country: Italy
- Region: Piedmont
- Province: Province of Cuneo (CN)

Area
  - Total: 11.9 km^{2} (4.6 sq mi)

Population (Dec. 2004)
  - Total: 542
  - Density: 45.5/km^{2} (118/sq mi)
- Time zone: UTC+1 (CET)
  - Summer (DST): UTC+2 (CEST)
- Postal code: 12050
- Dialing code: 0173

Lequio Berria is a comune (municipality) in the Province of Cuneo in the Italian region Piedmont, located about 60 kilometres (37 mi) southeast of Turin and about 50 kilometres (31 mi) northeast of Cuneo. As of 31 December 2004, it had a population of 542 and an area of 11.9 square kilometres (4.6 mi^{2}).

Lequio Berria borders the following municipalities: Albaretto della Torre, Arguello, Benevello, Borgomale, Bosia, Cravanzana, and Rodello.

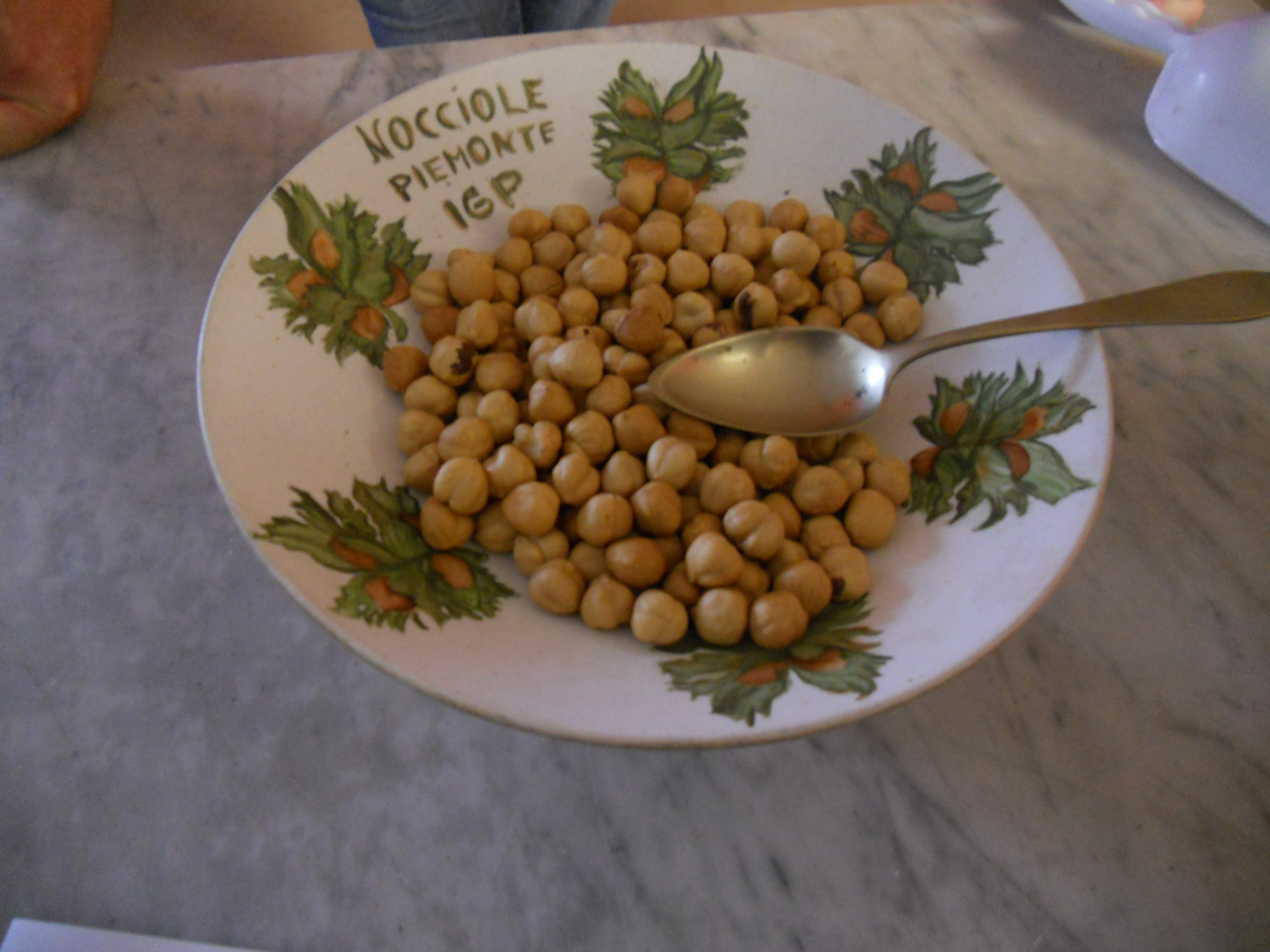
Piedmont hazelnuts, also known as Nocciola Piemonte (IGP), are grown in Lequio Berria

== Demographic evolution ==
Historical population

Year	Pop.	±%
1861	785	—
1871	833	+6.1%
1881	834	+0.1%
1901	1,112	+33.3%
1911	1,089	−2.1%

Year	Pop.	±%
1921	1,104	+1.4%
1931	1,058	−4.2%
1936	1,136	+7.4%
1951	969	−14.7%
1961	788	−18.7%

Year	Pop.	±%
1971	670	−15.0%
1981	619	−7.6%
1991	586	−5.3%
2001	524	−10.6%

Source: Data from ISTAT
