= Serralunga d'Alba =

- Comune
- Comune di Serralunga d'Alba
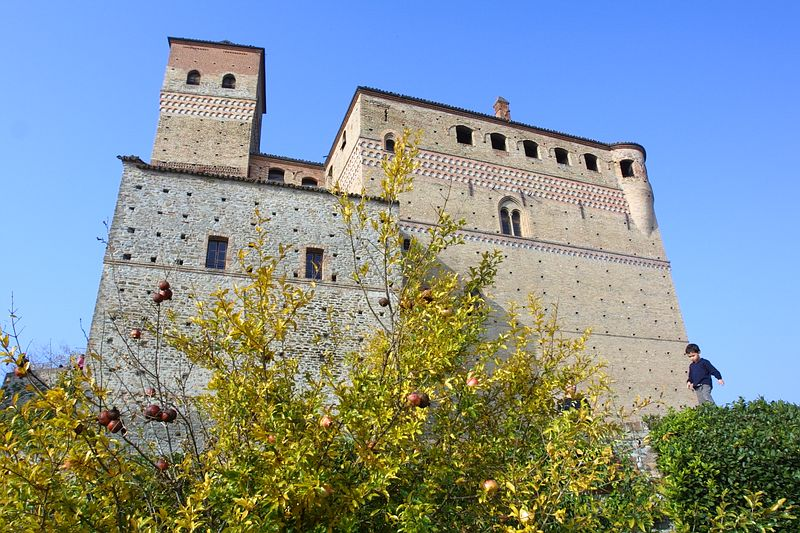
- The castle

- Coat of arms

- Location within Italy Location within Piedmont
- Coordinates: 44°36′39″N 8°0′0″E
- Country: Italy
- Region: Piedmont
- Province: Cuneo (CN)

Government
  - Mayor: Sergio Moscone

Area
  - Total: 8.44 km^{2} (3.26 sq mi)
- Elevation: 414 m (1,358 ft)

Population (31 December 2010)
  - Total: 535
  - Density: 63.4/km^{2} (164/sq mi)
- Demonym: Serralunghesi
- Time zone: UTC+1 (CET)
  - Summer (DST): UTC+2 (CEST)
- Postal code: 12050
- Dialing code: 0173
- Patron saint: St. Sebastian
- Saint day: January 20
- Website: Official website

Serralunga d'Alba is a comune (municipality) in the Province of Cuneo in the Italian region Piedmont, located about 60 kilometres (37 mi) southeast of Turin and about 45 kilometres (28 mi) northeast of Cuneo. It was built in the 14th century.

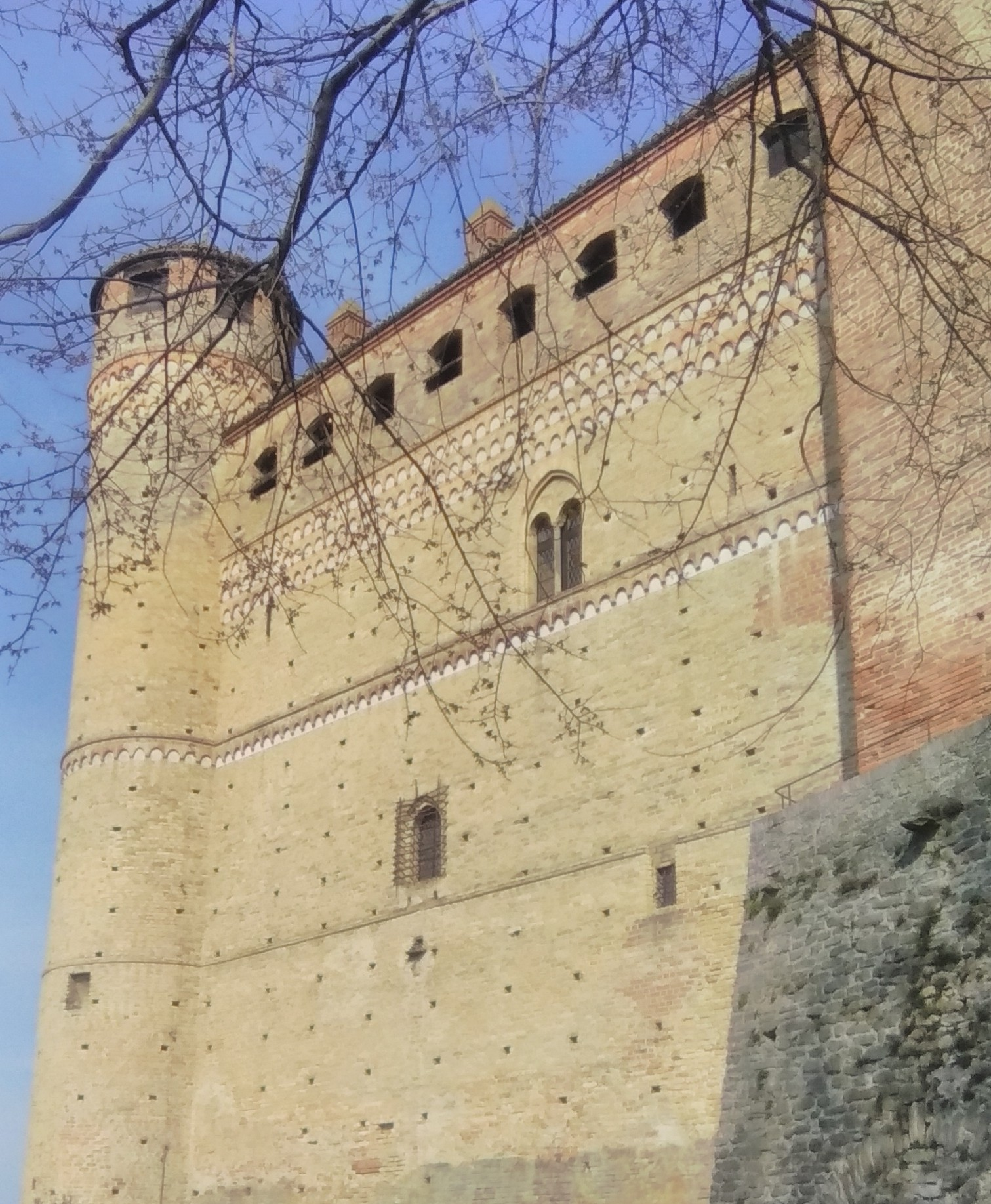
Closeup of the 14th century ominous castle

Serralunga d'Alba borders the following municipalities: Alba, Castiglione Falletto, Diano d'Alba, Monforte d'Alba, Montelupo Albese, Roddino, and Sinio. Main sights include Serralunga d'Alba Castle.
