= Roddino =

- Comune
- Comune di Roddino
- Location within Italy Location within Piedmont
- Coordinates: 44°35′N 8°1′E
- Country: Italy
- Region: Piedmont
- Province: Province of Cuneo (CN)
- Frazioni: Costepomo, San Lorenzo, Noé, Santa Maria, Pozzetti, Lopiano, Santa Margherita, Corini

Area
  - Total: 10.4 km^{2} (4.0 sq mi)
- Elevation: 610 m (2,000 ft)

Population (Dec. 2004)
  - Total: 386
  - Density: 37.1/km^{2} (96.1/sq mi)
- Demonym: Roddinesi
- Time zone: UTC+1 (CET)
  - Summer (DST): UTC+2 (CEST)
- Postal code: 12050
- Dialing code: 0173

Roddino is a comune (municipality) in the Province of Cuneo in the Italian region Piedmont, located about 60 kilometres (37 mi) southeast of Turin and about 45 kilometres (28 mi) northeast of Cuneo. As of 31 December 2004, it had a population of 386 and an area of 10.4 square kilometres (4.0 mi^{2}).

The municipality of Roddino contains the frazioni (subdivisions, mainly villages and hamlets) Costepomo, San Lorenzo, Noé, Santa Maria, Pozzetti, Lopiano, Santa Margherita, and Corini.

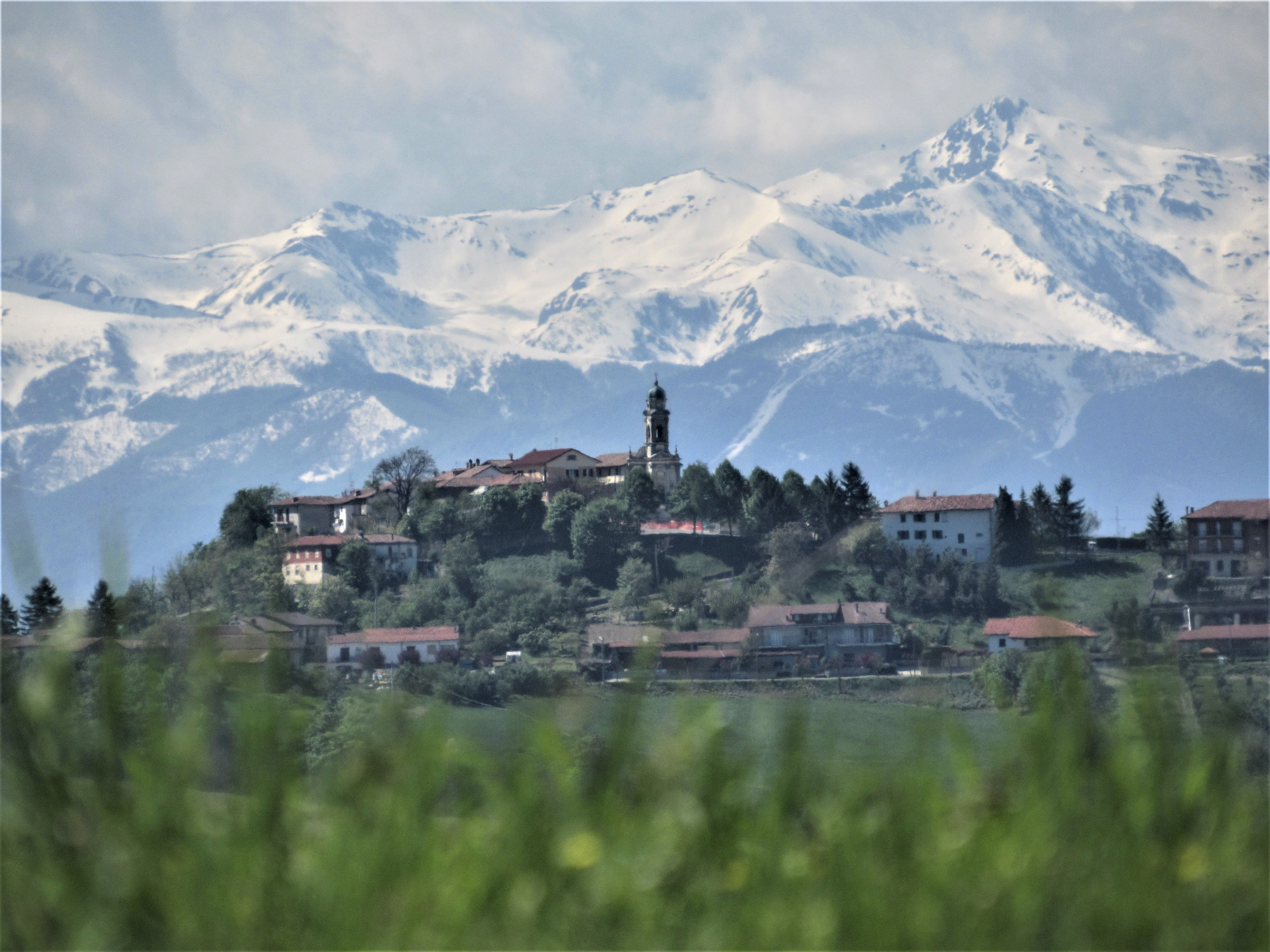

Roddino borders the following municipalities: Cerreto Langhe, Cissone, Dogliani, Monforte d'Alba, Serralunga d'Alba, Serravalle Langhe, and Sinio.

== Demographic evolution ==
Historical population

Year	Pop.	±%
1861	656	—
1871	675	+2.9%
1881	703	+4.1%
1901	920	+30.9%
1911	888	−3.5%

Year	Pop.	±%
1921	905	+1.9%
1931	988	+9.2%
1936	923	−6.6%
1951	836	−9.4%
1961	640	−23.4%

Year	Pop.	±%
1971	493	−23.0%
1981	413	−16.2%
1991	381	−7.7%
2001	363	−4.7%

Source: Data from ISTAT
