= Diano d'Alba =

- Comune
- Comune di Diano d'Alba
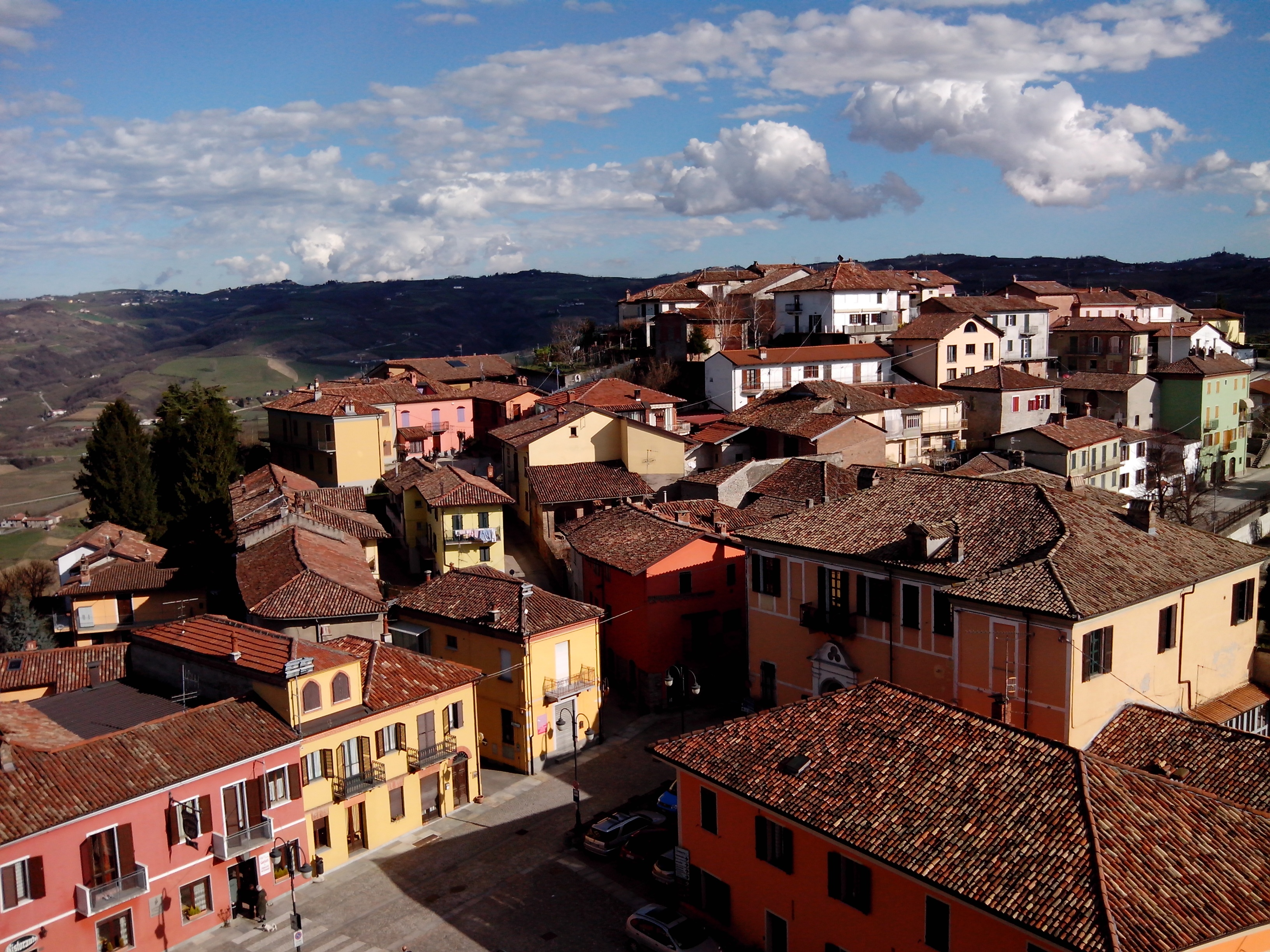
- View over Diano d'Alba from the panoramic point

- Coat of arms

- Location within Italy Location within Piedmont
- Coordinates: 44°39′N 8°2′E
- Country: Italy
- Region: Piedmont
- Province: Cuneo (CN)
- Frazioni: Ricca, Valle Telloria

Government
  - Mayor: Ezio Cardinale

Area
  - Total: 17.7 km^{2} (6.8 sq mi)
- Elevation: 496 m (1,627 ft)

Population (30 June 2017)
  - Total: 3,607
  - Density: 204/km^{2} (528/sq mi)
- Time zone: UTC+1 (CET)
  - Summer (DST): UTC+2 (CEST)
- Postal code: 12055
- Dialing code: 0173
- Website: Official website

Diano d'Alba is a comune (municipality) in the Province of Cuneo in the Italian region Piedmont, located about 50 kilometres (31 mi) southeast of Turin and about 50 kilometres (31 mi) northeast of Cuneo.

Diano d'Alba borders the following municipalities: Alba, Benevello, Grinzane Cavour, Montelupo Albese, Rodello and Serralunga d'Alba.

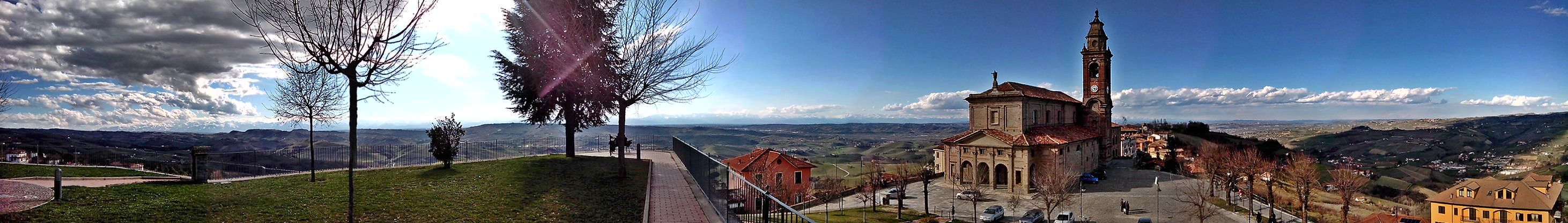
Langhe and Diano's church seen from the panoramic point

== Twin towns ==
Diano d'Alba is twinned with:

- Diano Marina, Italy, since 2007
- Néoules, France, since 2007
- Dolegna del Collio, Italy, since 2007
