= Bosia, Piedmont =

Bosia
- Comune
- Comune di Bosia
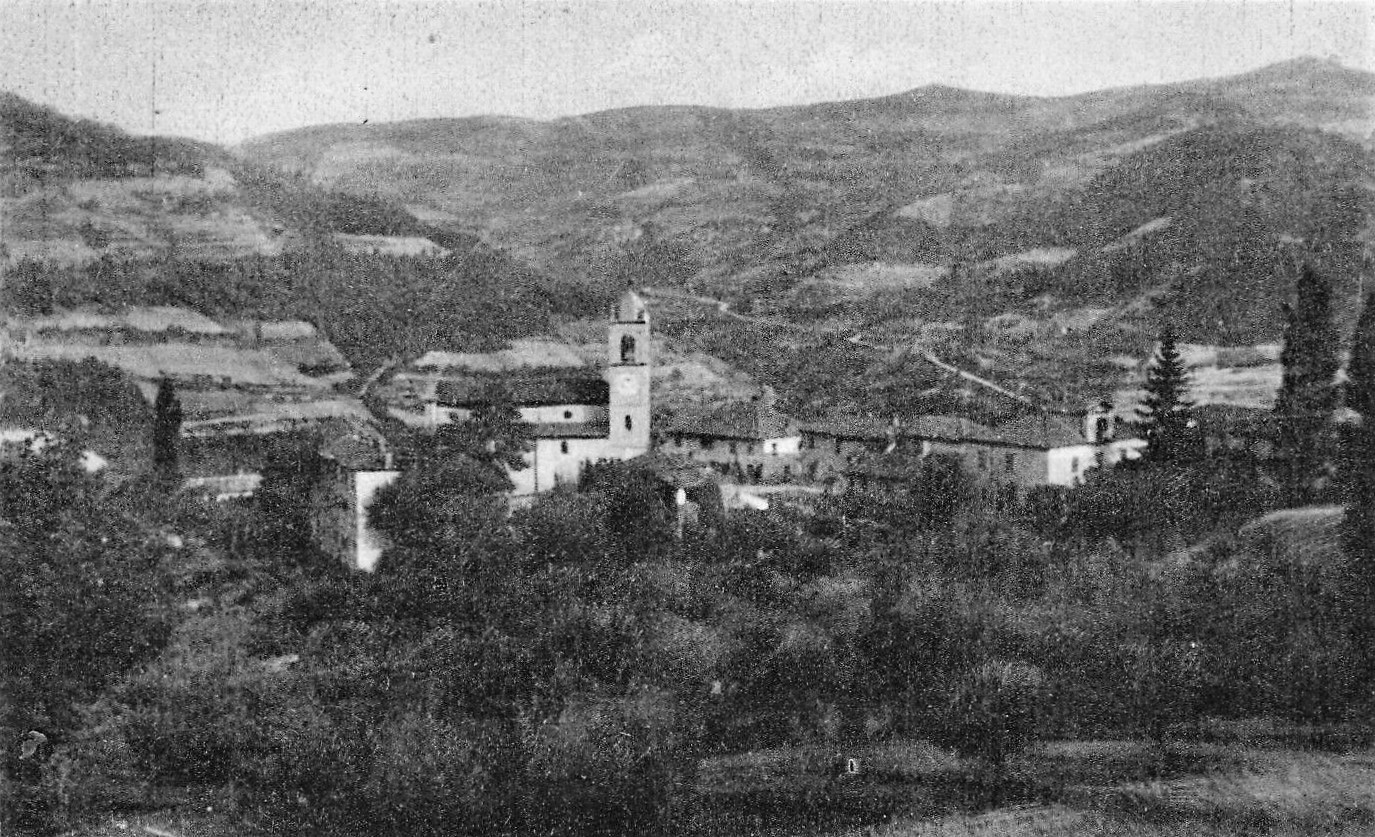

- Coat of arms

- Location within Italy Location within Piedmont
- Coordinates: 44°36′N 8°9′E
- Country: Italy
- Region: Piedmont
- Province: Province of Cuneo (CN)

Government
  - Mayor: Ettore Secco

Area
  - Total: 5.6 km^{2} (2.2 sq mi)
- Elevation: 484 m (1,588 ft)

Population (30 November 2017)
  - Total: 181
  - Density: 32/km^{2} (84/sq mi)
- Demonym: Bosiesi
- Time zone: UTC+1 (CET)
  - Summer (DST): UTC+2 (CEST)
- Postal code: 12050
- Dialing code: 0173

Bosia is a comune (municipality) in the Province of Cuneo in the Italian region Piedmont, located about 60 kilometres (37 mi) southeast of Turin and about 50 kilometres (31 mi) northeast of Cuneo.

Bosia borders the following municipalities: Borgomale, Castino, Cortemilia, Cravanzana, Lequio Berria, and Torre Bormida.

== History ==
The village of Bosia once stood in a different place. It was rebuilt on its current site — where a village called Rutte was — after a massive landslide on 8 April 1679 killed 200 inhabitants when the village suddenly sank.
