= Arguello =

- Comune
- Comune di Arguello
- Location within Italy Location within Piedmont
- Coordinates: 44°35′N 8°7′E
- Country: Italy
- Region: Piedmont
- Province: Province of Cuneo (CN)

Area
  - Total: 5.0 km^{2} (1.9 sq mi)

Population (Dec. 2004)
  - Total: 184
  - Density: 37/km^{2} (95/sq mi)
- Time zone: UTC+1 (CET)
  - Summer (DST): UTC+2 (CEST)
- Postal code: 12050
- Dialing code: 0173

Arguello (Piedmontese: Arguèl) is a comune (municipality) in the Province of Cuneo in the Italian region Piedmont, located about 60 kilometres (37 mi) southeast of Turin and about 50 kilometres (31 mi) northeast of Cuneo. As of 31 December 2004, it had a population of 184 and an area of 5.0 square kilometres (1.9 mi^{2}).

Arguello borders the following municipalities: Albaretto della Torre, Cerreto Langhe, Cravanzana, and Lequio Berria.

== Demographic evolution ==
Historical population

Year	Pop.	±%
1861	253	—
1871	250	−1.2%
1881	220	−12.0%
1901	288	+30.9%
1911	265	−8.0%

Year	Pop.	±%
1921	314	+18.5%
1931	299	−4.8%
1936	298	−0.3%
1951	289	−3.0%
1961	175	−39.4%

Year	Pop.	±%
1971	149	−14.9%
1981	175	+17.4%
1991	186	+6.3%
2001	174	−6.5%

Source: Data from ISTAT
