= Jose Chacón Medina Salazar y Villaseñor =

Spanish official

José Chacón Medina Salazar y Villaseñor

35th Spanish Governor of New Mexico
- In office 1707–1712
- Preceded by: Francisco Cuervo y Valdés
- Succeeded by: Juan Ignacio Flores Mogollón

Personal details
- Born: 1668 Seville, Spain
- Died: Unknown
- Profession: Military and Governor of New Mexico

José Chacón Medina Salazar y Villaseñor (1668 - ??) was a Spanish official who served as Governor of New Mexico between 1707 and 1712. Salazar y Villaseñor was Marquis de Peñuela and Knight of the Order of Santiago.

== Early life ==
Jose Chacón Medina Salazar y Villaseñor was born in 1668. He joined the Spanish Army in his youth, eventually becoming an Admiral of the Marines.

== New Spain ==
He was appointed Captain General and Governor of Santa Fe de Nuevo México in 1707, in place of Francisco Cuervo y Valdés.

Chacon rebuilt the chapel at San Miguel, Santa Fe, which had been destroyed in the Pueblo uprising of 1680. Under his orders, Hurtado made a military campaign against the Navajo people.

In 1703, Sebastian Martin obtained an area of the land of his brother, northeast of the Pueblo of San Juan, but lost the testimony and writing documenting the lease. So in 1712, Martin asked Governor Salazar y Villaseñor for confirmation of his property. On May 23, 1712, Chacon investigated the case and decided to put Martin under protection, to prevent him from being attacked by the Amerindians. So, Chacón officially accepted the re-delivery of the land to Martin, voiding "all other instruments" and ordered Provincial Secretary Cristóbal de Góngora to handed back the land to him.

In 1712, Salazar y Villaseñor was replaced by Juan Ignacio Flores Mogollon in the New Mexico government .
