= Fernando de Argüello =

Fernando de Arguello Carvajal

13th Spanish Governor of New Mexico
- In office 6 December 1644 – 4 May 1647
- Preceded by: Alonso de Pacheco de Herédia
- Succeeded by: Luis de Guzmán y Figueroa

Personal details
- Profession: Soldier and Governor of New Mexico

Fernando de Argüello was a Spanish soldier who served as Governor of New Mexico, between 1644 and 1647.

== Career ==
Fernando de Arguello Carvajal joined the Spanish Army in his youth, and eventually became a captain.

Arguello was appointed Governor of Santa Fe de Nuevo México on 6 December 1644.

During the Fernando de Arguello administration, a conspiracy was formed by the Jemez Pueblo. Arguello was warned of a possible joint revolt of the Jemez and Apache peoples. The Jemez and Apache were thinking of revolting because of Spanish settlements in New Mexico and Franciscan abuse against them. After the revolt, Arguello hanged twenty-nine Jemez for treason and alliance with the Apaches. Forty other Native Americans were whipped and imprisoned.

However, on 4 May 1647, Carvajal was sent to Mexico City and imprisoned for offences against the Crown. However, Arguello fled to somewhere near Parral (in Chihuahua, modern Mexico). All the properties he had were appropriated and destroyed and the Spanish Crown sent another military force to Santa Fe de Mexico City to replace him as governor of the province. The Crown appointed to Luis de Guzmán y Figueroa in place Arguello as governor of New Mexico.
