= Luis de Rosas =

9th Spanish Governor of New Mexico
- In office 1637 – Spring 1641
- Preceded by: Francisco Martínez de Baeza
- Succeeded by: Juan Flores de Sierra y Valdés

Personal details
- Died: January 25, 1642
- Profession: Soldier and administrator (governor of New Mexico)

Luis de Rosas (died January 25, 1642) was a soldier who served as the ninth Spanish Governor of New Mexico from 1637 until 1641, when he was then imprisoned and assassinated. During his administration, de Rosas clashed with the Franciscans, mainly because of his handling of the indigenous Americans, whom he forced to work for him or sold them as slaves. The Franciscans promoted a revolt of the citizens of New Mexico against him. De Rosas was imprisoned after an investigation relating to his position as governor. He was killed by soldiers while in prison.

== Early years ==
In his youth, De Rosas joined the Spanish Army, where he excelled and reached higher ranks. He served the Spanish Army in Flanders for fifteen years.

== Government in New Mexico ==
=== Politics in New Mexico ===
The Viceroy, Díez de Armendáriz, appointed de Rosas as governor of New Mexico in 1636. Initially, De Rosas opposed the appointment due to the unpopularity of the New Mexico government and the impact of the appointment on his reputation. This was because mutinies against governors were frequent in New Mexico, as well as by the "seizure" of the governments of the province. However, his role had been decided in advance and he was forced to accept it. De Rosas arrived to New Spain with the virrey in this year and, probably, moved from Mexico City to Santa Fe, New Mexico in the caravan of the supply mission.

A De Rosas troop established a fortification around Santo Domingo to protect Santa Fe from the external attacks. De Rosas headed an expedition to Ipotlapiguas village in 1638. The expedition had been planned by a priest named Salas and composed of a group of five Franciscans and forty soldiers. The expedition traveled to northern Sonora, southwest of the Zuni lands, and aimed to convert the indigenous population to Christianity.

De Rosas led slave raids against several Native American peoples, particularly Apaches and Utes. In the Plains, he attacked the Apaches during an expedition to Quivira and later, in the north of Santa Fe de Nuevo Mexico, attacked the Utes. In both cases he captured slaves to sell or use in his workshops. In addition, De Rosas sacked ranches of Gira in Zuni lands. He also promoted trade with Native tribes in the Plains (although this trade was considered illegal) and he let that the Native Americans of the village of Pecos practice their religion on the condition they paid double the price of the encomienda's tribute that the Spaniard authorities demanded of them, contributing to his personal enrichment.

De Rosas employed Native American labor to manufacture products to sell, both prisoners captured from enemy tribes and the inhabitants of several Amerindian villages. The first ones worked in his weaving workshop in Santa Fe, while the second ones were employed in their own villages. He also forced Native Americans to work on plantations. In addition, he traded with the Apache.

=== Confrontations with the Franciscans ===
After De Rosas took office in New Mexico, many Spanish residents rebelled against him because of the confrontation between De Rosas and the Franciscans. The Franciscans were the main religious group in the Spanish colonies of Americas, aiming to evangelize the natives; they and de Rosas issued complaints and accusations against each other, causing political instability in the colony. Revolts and riots spread across New Mexico.

De Rosas accused the friars of not granting the sacraments and confessions to parishioners, even if they asked for it, and to excommunicate some of them. The Franciscans accused De Rosas of having accepted the capture of Apaches, some of whom were enslaved and traded in other places of New Spain, while others were taken to his own workshop, in the capital of New Mexico, to work for him. According to the Franciscans, De Rosas introduced both Christians and non-Christian Native Americans to a situation of near–slavery, forcing them to work long hours. He gave the Native Americans permission to exercise some of the rites of their particular religions if they allowed him to sell some of his property. In addition, De Rosas was upset when he learned that the Indigenous did not have the required hides for exchange them for his knives in the Pecos Pueblo lands. He accused the Franciscans for this fact, and jailed one. The Franciscans complained about the fact that De Rosas had been bribed by his predecessor, Francisco Martínez de Baeza. However, De Rosas dismissed this, arguing that the Franciscans' objections to him began when he ordered the closure of an illegal sweatshop in a mission. The workshop exploited child Amerindian labor, but the Franciscans had since tried to provoke revolts against De Rosas in the province.

So, after the imprisonment of a delinquent by De Rosas, two Franciscans promoted the prisoner's release sending a crowd to the Palace of the Governors gates to demand his release. Many citizens of the province participated in that revolt, among them 73 of the 120 soldiers New Mexico employed. The Franciscans "withheld the Sacrament" from De Rosas and "threatened his life". In the spring of 1638, Father Perea, who investigated the allegations about De Rosas, decided to leave the Inquisition. In January 1640, De Rosas forced all the ecclesiastics of Santa Fe to left the city, and when two of them, particularly two priests, returned the city three months later, De Rosas hit them with a stick, causing them significant injuries.

=== Revolt and imprisonment of De Rosas ===
De Rosas finished his term in spring 1641. The viceroy of New Spain, Diego López Pacheco, ordered an investigation of the De Rosas administration and the new governor, General Juan Flores Sierra y Valdes, led the investigation. De Rosas was excommunicated and imprisoned. That caused the Pueblo Native Americans, who placed much importance on religion, to begin to underestimate the power the Spanish government and Church. They deemed some priests liars, refused to obey the excommunicated governors and rejected the disunity between churchmen and governors.

A few months later, on January 25, 1642, when De Rosas was in his cell, he was killed by the soldier Nicolás Ortiz, a native of Zacatecas (modern Mexico), who stabbed him. The soldier alleged, in the trial held against him, that De Rosas was adulterous with his wife, Maria de Bustillas. Several months later, however, eight other soldiers were found guilty of killing de Rosas and were beheaded.
