= Montelupo Albese =

- Comune
- Comune di Montelupo Albese
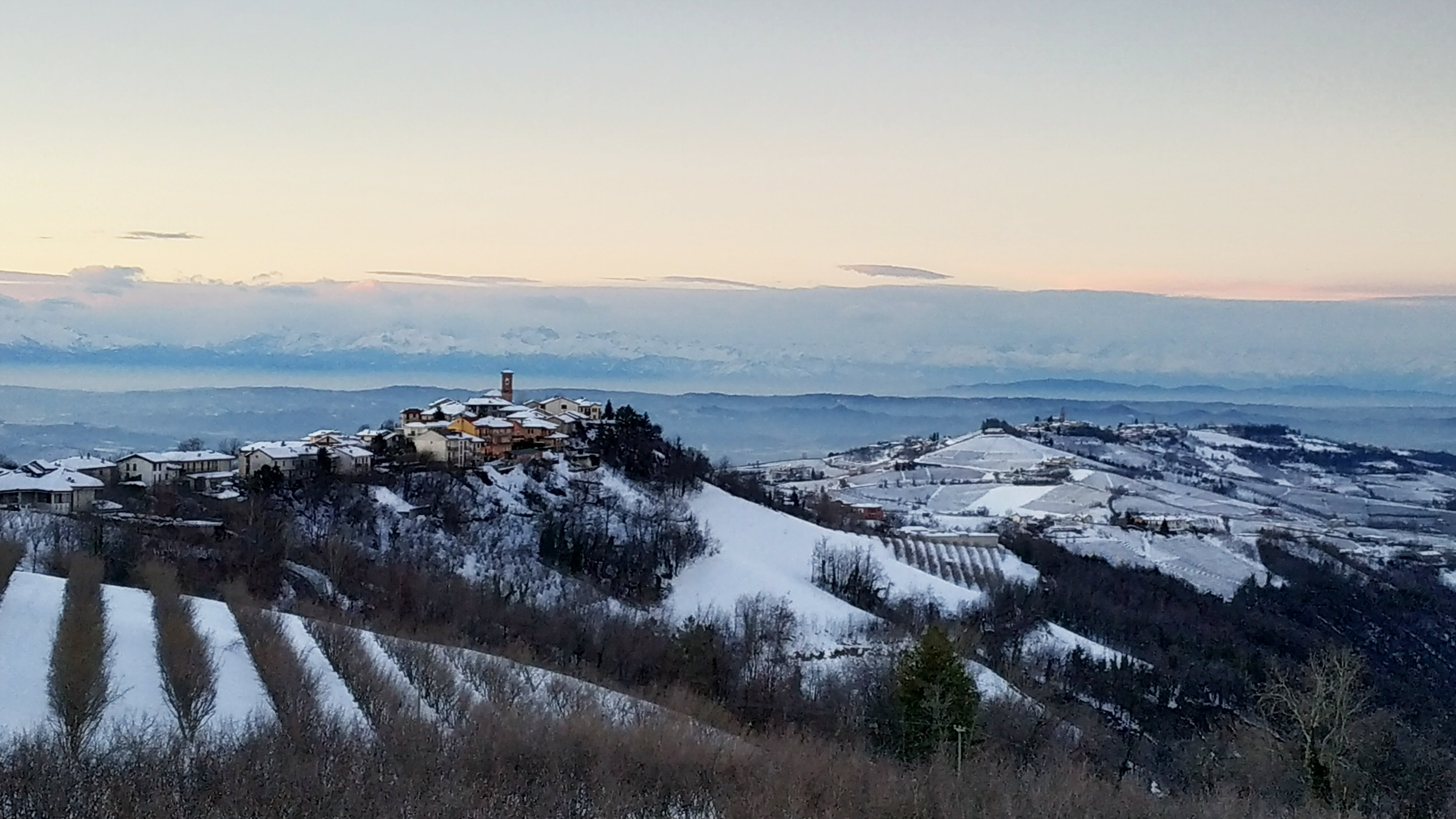

- Coat of arms

- Location within Italy Location within Piedmont
- Coordinates: 44°37′N 8°3′E
- Country: Italy
- Region: Piedmont
- Province: Cuneo (CN)

Government
  - Mayor: Luciano Marengo

Area
  - Total: 6.4 km^{2} (2.5 sq mi)
- Elevation: 564 m (1,850 ft)

Population (31 December 2010)
  - Total: 536
  - Density: 84/km^{2} (220/sq mi)
- Time zone: UTC+1 (CET)
  - Summer (DST): UTC+2 (CEST)
- Postal code: 12050
- Dialing code: 0173

Montelupo Albese is a comune (municipality) in the Province of Cuneo in the Italian region Piedmont, located about 60 kilometres (37 mi) southeast of Turin and about 45 kilometres (28 mi) northeast of Cuneo.

Montelupo Albese borders the following municipalities: Diano d'Alba, Rodello, Serralunga d'Alba, and Sinio.
