= Monte Nebin =

Mountain in the Cozie Alps, Italy

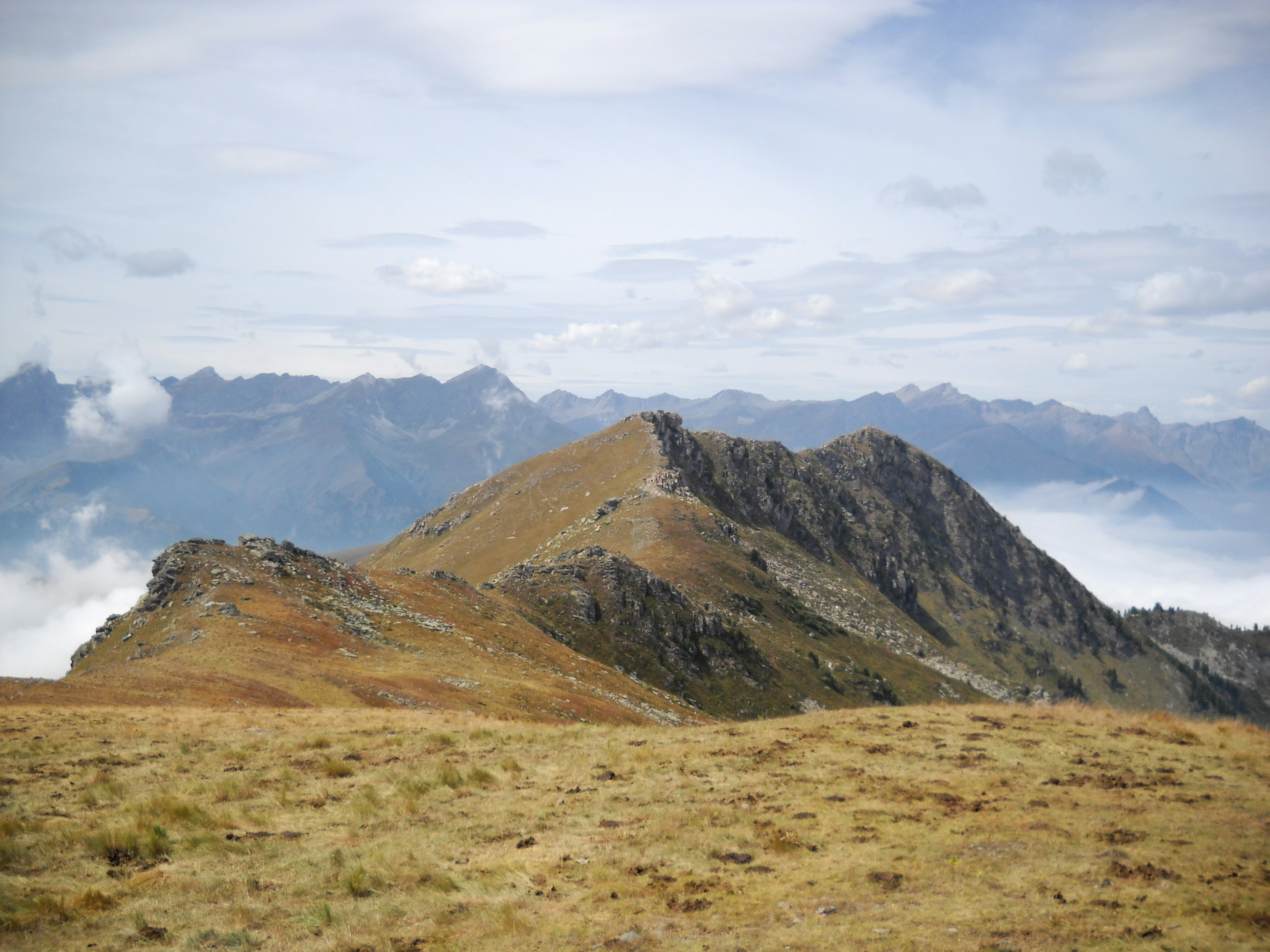
- Monte Nebin (right) and the nearby peak 2514 (further left) seen from the east

Highest point
- Prominence: 245 m (804 ft)
- Coordinates: 44°32′34″N 7°08′43″E

Geography

Monte Nebin (2,510 m above sea level) is a mountain in the Cottian Alps, located on the watershed between the Varaita Valley and the Maira Valley, in the Province of Cuneo.

== Characteristics ==
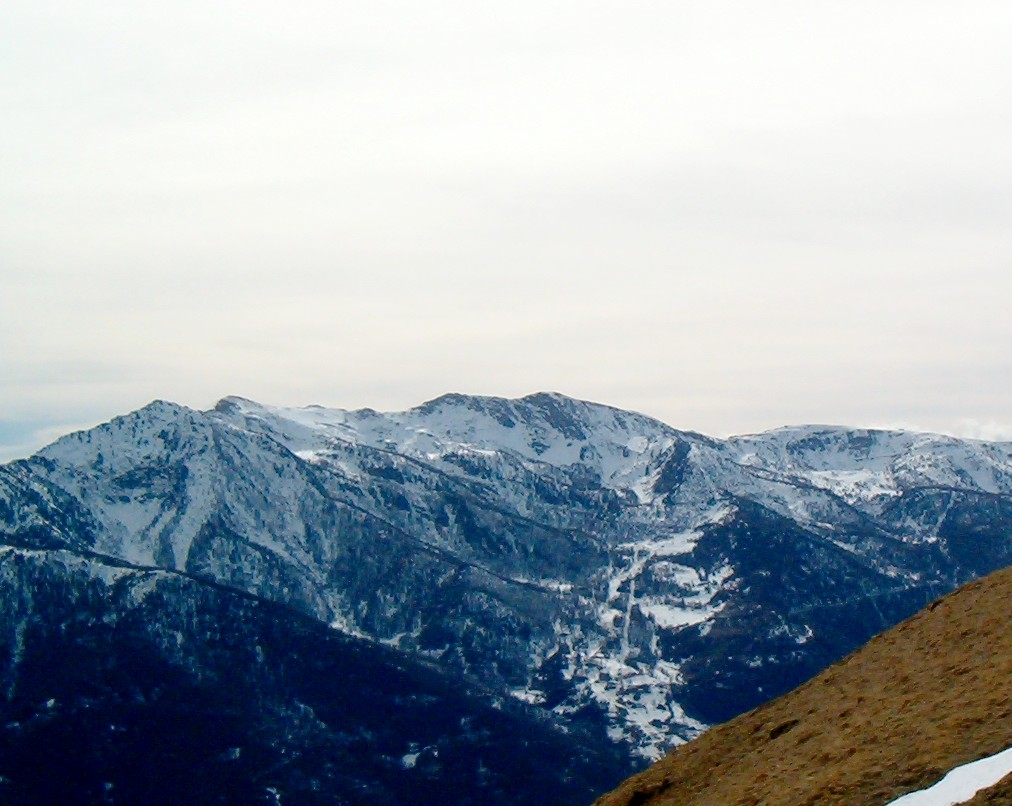
Northern slope (Varaita Valley) of Monte Nebin

It is situated on the ridge that, branching off from the main Alpine watershed at Monte Maniglia, descends to Monte San Bernardo, separating the Varaita Valley to the north from the Maira Valley to the south. The summit lies on the border between the municipal territories of Sampeyre in the Varaita Valley and Stroppo in the Maira Valley.

The main ridge in this area has a slightly zigzagging course. From the Colle di Sampeyre, it descends southeast to the summit of Cugn di Goria (2,384 m), then, following a semicircular path, it turns east and reaches the Bassa dell'Ajet (2,310 m). Continuing generally eastward, the ridge ascends, with a slight southward concavity, to reach the summit of Monte Nebin. Here, it turns southeast, slightly descends, and reaches Peak 2514, from where it continues east-southeast, descending to the Bassa di Rasis (2,425 m); it then assumes a semicircular shape with a northeast concavity, ascending to Monte Cugulet (2,454 m). A secondary ridge branches off from the summit, descending north toward the underlying Pian delle Baracche.

The slope facing the Maira Valley consists of uniform grassy slopes with a moderate incline. The northern sector also slopes regularly toward the Pian delle Baracche, while the eastern slope of the secondary ridge branching from the summit and the Varaita Valley side of the ridge from the summit to the Bassa di Rasis consists of steep, almost vertical cliffs that drop toward the underlying Pian Monbel.

The summit is an elongated grassy ridge with some rocky outcrops; at the highest point stands a steel lattice cross.

From a geological perspective, the mountain belongs to the ophiolite-bearing limestone complex. The summit is primarily composed of microcrystalline platy limestone from the Lower Cretaceous. To the southeast, toward the Bassa di Rasis, metamorphic rocks of magmatic origin (prasinite, metagabbro, metaporfido, metadiabase) emerge, also attributable to the same period, while further toward Monte Cugulet, the main mass of true calcschist is found. A fault line emerges at the Bassa dell'Ajet, with a trace oriented ENE-WSW; north of the fault, in the amphitheater of the Pian delle Baracche, metamorphic serpentine rocks (serpentinite, serpentinoscist, chloritoscist) are found.

On the southern slope runs the Strada dei Cannoni, an old military road that, from the Colletta di Rossana, ascends the watershed between the Varaita and Maira valleys, often staying on the Maira side, reaching the Colle della Bicocca. In this area, the road, ascending from the Colle Birrone, climbs to an elevation of about 2,300 m, which it maintains at the base of the mountain until the Bassa dell'Ajet, from where it continues toward the Colle di Sampeyre.

== Ascent to the summit ==
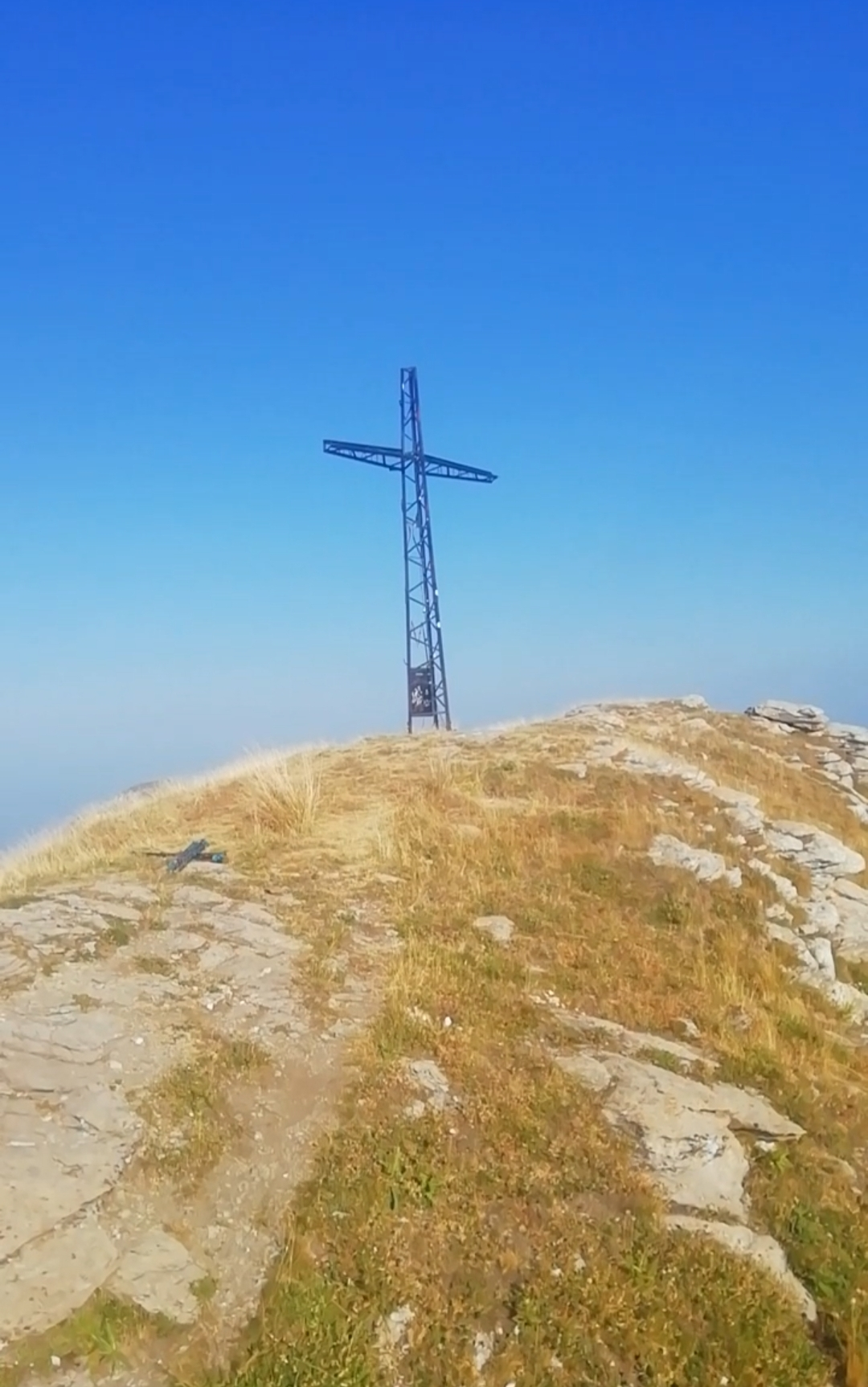
The summit cross of Monte Nebin.

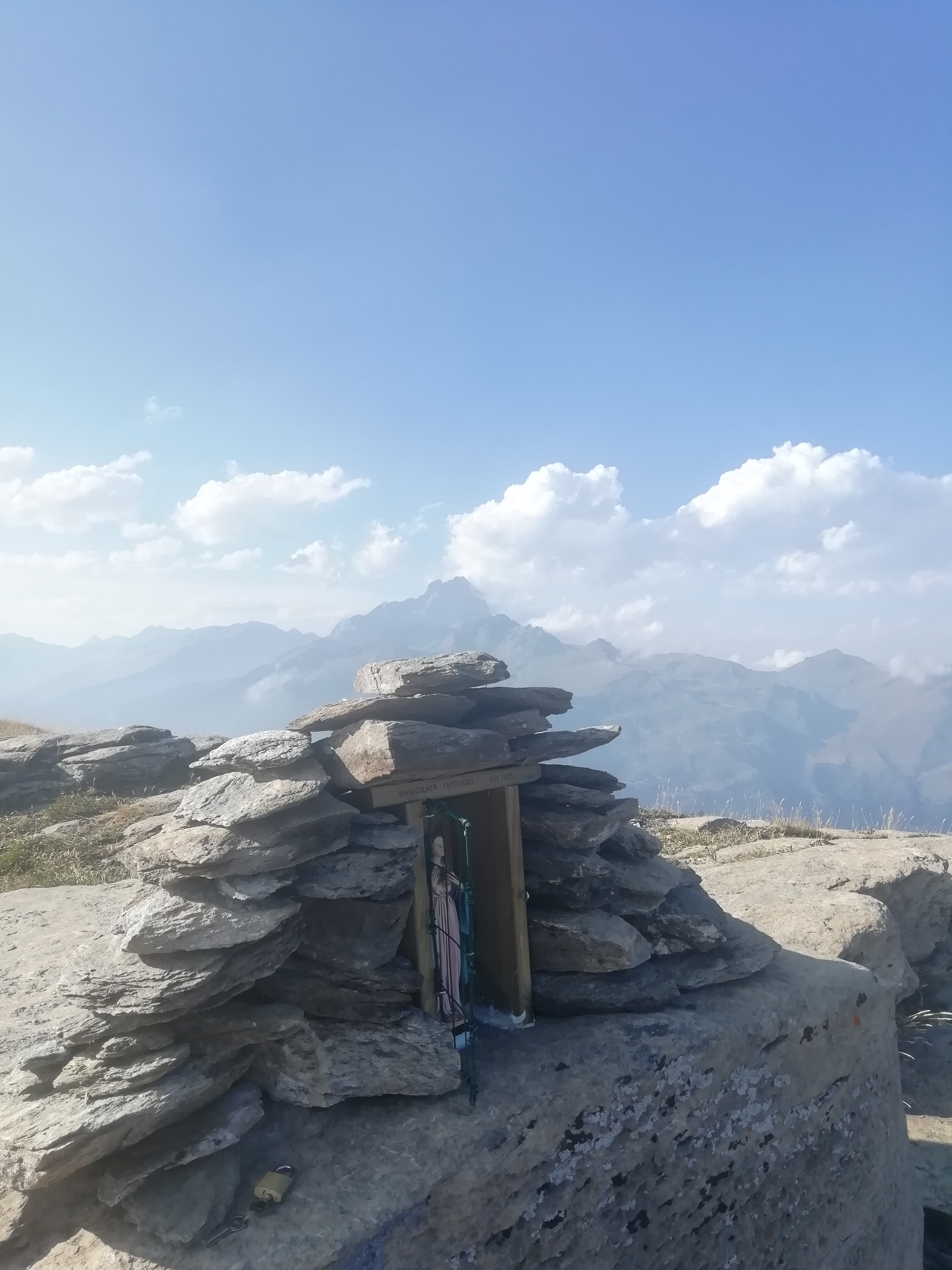
The summit Madonnina of Monte Nebin, with Monviso in the background.

The summit is reachable via an easy hiking route, with the shortest path following the western ridge, starting from the Colle di Sampeyre or the Bassa dell'Ajet. A longer but equally easy route starts from Morinesio, a hamlet of Stroppo in the Maira Valley: via trails, it reaches the Strada dei Cannoni, from which, ascending the southern slope, the summit is reached.

The summit is also accessible in snow, either with snowshoes or with skis. At the summit, there are a cross and a summit Madonnina.

== Bibliography ==
- Official Italian cartography of the Istituto Geografico Militare (IGM) at scales 1:25,000 and 1:100,000, available online
- Territorial Information System of the Province of Cuneo, based on 1:10,000 cartography
- Istituto Geografico Centrale - Trail map 1:50,000 no. 6 "Monviso"
- Province of Cuneo - Valle Maira Mountain Community: Trail map scale 1:25,000 Valle Maira
