= Second Battle of Casteldelfino =

1744 battle

- Part of the War of the Austrian Succession
Date	18 July 1744
Location	Casteldelfino, in present-day Cuneo, Italy
Result	French victory

Belligerents
Kingdom of France	Kingdom of Sardinia

Commanders and leaders
Ballì de Givry; Prince of Conti	Charles Emmanuel III of Savoy

Strength
5,000	2,000

Casualties and losses
1,900 dead or wounded	2,000 dead, wounded, or captured

The Second Battle of Casteldelfino was a military engagement in July 1744 during the War of the Austrian Succession between France and the Kingdom of Sardinia.

== Preliminary moves ==
An initial French offensive into Piedmont had been beaten off after three days of fighting in the Varaita valley, near the village of Casteldelfino (7–10 October 1743).

In July 1744, a French army under the Prince of Contì tried to enter Piedmont from the western Alps. The first columns of the French army took the head of the Stura and Maira Valleys, while three other columns, the 7th, 8th and 9th, were positioned at the head of the Varaita valley. The 7th column was composed of six battalions under Lieutenant general Don Louis Gandinga. It left Guillestre and came through San Paul and Maurin, taking the head of Col d'Agnello to threaten the valley of Châteaudauphin (Casteldelfino). It then withdrew to gain Acceglio in the Maira valley in support of the 6th column under Lieutenant General Compte de Lautrec, who had orders to gain Preit village to threaten the Maira.

Marquis de Camposanto, a lieutenant general with five battalions that composed the 8th column, advanced from the camp of Pontcernieres near Briançon, just short of the Varaita and Maira valleys. Baillì de Givri, a lieutenant general at the head of ten battalions that formed the 9th column, captured the Montgeneve gap and descended into the valley of Cesana to deceive the Sardinian king Charles Emmanuel III. Givri made a feint and took Gardetta at the valley of Bellino and also seized the top of Col du Bondormir that dominates the valley of Chateaudauphin. Brigadier general François de Chevert commanded 1,500 men from several regiments and four companies of grenadiers from Poitou's brigade. All these nine columns were at the positions assigned by Contì after traveling on roads heavily soaked by rain.

Prince Conti and Infante Philip of Spain, going down to the Col de l'Argentera at the head of their column, took Bersezio in the Stura valley before the rock of the Barricade. The Savoyard Lieutenant General Pallavicini, informed by his spies that three enemy corps were approaching with an envelopment maneuver, abandoned the high and the low Lobiera and the camp of the Montagnetta, strong positions for any army to take. After his success, Prince Conti was worried about the situations of the columns that were fighting on his left. Marechal de camp de Villemur sent an officer to give news of the victory on the right, but the messenger drowned. Other couriers were sent at the same time to Ballì de Givrì and Marquis Pallavicini, but they were not able to arrive in time to stop the futile fight in the Varaita Valley.

Lieutenant general de Gandica, at the head of the 7th column, took Acceglio in the Maira Valley, then went into the Varaita valley to support the 8th and the 9th columns. Marquis de Camposanto, chief of the 8th column, reached the mountain of Traversiera with five battalions. To arrive there he marched to the foot of Mont Peirol, where he advanced against the entrenched camp at the Bicocca plateau. His purpose was not a general assault. He only wished to create some noise and to avoid the enemy's presence at the main entrenchments of Pierre Longue. Ballì de Grivri made a feint and came with the 9th column from Briancon to the other side of the Montgeneve. He then came back and went to Col d'Agnello. He commanded Compte de Danois, a lieutenant general, and ten battalions, of whom three were from Poitou's regiment under Lieutenant colonel Morenne. He also had a vanguard under Chevert, who commanded a detachment of 1,500 men and four companies of grenadiers. Chevert attacked the outpost of Chayol on July 16, but withdrew after exchanging fire with enemy forces near Gardetta.

During the night of the 16th and 17th, the French camped at Chayol while Savoyard troops did the same at Gardetta. At around this time, the French were informed about enemy positions by a spy.

== Battle ==
With Chevert knowing that the enemy had equivalent numbers, he decided to attack. French grenadiers struggled to make inroads into Bondormir and had to assault several staunchly defended buildings in the process. At this time, Danois arrived with Poitou's brigade. Chevert ordered an outflanking maneuver to trap the enemy, but the Sardinians retreated in good order under the cover of 300 dragoons. The French army descended to Celle di Bellino after destroying the buildings at Gardetta. They then headed to Bondormir and still had difficulties taking the trenches. From here they climbed over Pierrelongue and joined other detached groups arriving from parallel paths. Chevert now wanted an immediate full-scale attack and a French war council agreed to launch this assault the next day.

As soon as the Piedmontese could see the enemy on top of Pierrelongue, they destroyed the communications running from Bondormir and prepared defenses. The enemy was preparing a better zig-zag path through Pierrelongue’s ravine on the north face to reach the top of the mountain. Chevert had to prepare the attack with 1,500 men and they had to take the Pas du Chat, a deep ravine with slippery terrain. At the end of this gap, there were 400 Piedmontese grenadiers and a battery of cannons. When Chevert moved, the mountain was covered by thick fog, and he was not able to see the trenches. He received a whole volley from some grenadiers who could hear him but they could not recognize his position. Chevert ordered a faster descent, to fix bayonets, and to avoid any exchange of fire with the enemy. The French charged and the enemy withdrew towards the redoubt of the Baraccone in great confusion. The Piedmontese abandoned their tents and burned three great stacks of wood to inform Bicocca's garrison that Pierrelongue was in French hands.

The French column descended from Pierrelongue without great loss, despite heavy artillery shelling. It attacked the second redoubt on the Battagliola peak, forcing the Sardinians to flee. The French stopped their advance at Battagliola and held this position for about two hours to attend Mass and to take some rest. They later advanced against the heavily defended Mount Cavallo redoubt. The Sardinian commanders were Verger and Brigadier Chevalier Castagnole. Before the battle Chevert sent his aide-de-camp to Verger, a major of the Regiment de Provence, to intimate the surrender or run the risk of having the entire garrison executed. Verger declined the call for surrender. Chevert ordered an immediate attack, but he wanted to inform de Givrì so the latter would come to his aid. Chevert told de Givri to do nothing without first being given orders. Poor supply conditions convinced Chevert that a massive attack was required to rescue the situation.

Chevert's troops were to attack the battery while Poitou's brigade would advance on his right. In the center there was the regiment of Provence. Colonel Salis had to take a plateau over the Bellino ravine to avoid the presence of four Sardinian battalions south of the mountain.

The column advanced without sacks to be more efficient in combat, but it could not advance in good order on such mountainous terrain; some soldiers went over to the others and the three corps attacked in only one great column. The weather was very dark on that day and a great, thick fog covered the redoubt; the French arrived within 50 meters of enemy positions undetected. A fierce exchange of fire opened the fight. The French were on open ground and took a heavy pounding. They had been fighting for more than four hours at a range of only ten paces from the Sardinian positions and eventually had to withdraw. De Givrì wanted to continue the fight and sent in a fresh line of battalions. The attack was renewed with such courage and bravery that the French again reached the palisades, but they were ejected with great loss. De Givrì, badly wounded in the thigh during this second assault, ordered his men to withdraw.

Since the order arrived in the middle of the action, soldiers of Poitou's regiment wanted to continue the fight and asked for the flag. This was a dangerous moment, with bullets flying everywhere. Danois ordered a withdrawal because many higher-ranking officers were either killed or badly wounded, but the soldiers did not obey. They knew it would be a precarious withdrawal and decided to take down the palisade instead. They were fortunate that Colonel Salis left his position at that moment and attacked the redoubt from the rear. This action decided the battle: when the Sardinians moved to stop Salis' attack, a renewed charge by the French carried all before them and compelled the Sardinians to surrender.

The battle finished one hour before the night of July 19, 1744. The Sardinian army lost 1,350 men. French losses were also significant.

== Aftermath ==
Charles Emmanuel III removed all artillery from the forts of San Carlo and Bertola an Chateau when he heard of the defeat. He went to Chateau Dauphin to receive the 200 survivors of the Mount Caval massacre. Charles then left Chateau Dauphin and went to Sampeyre, where he met general Guibert, who was at Bicocca. He also gave orders to the knights of Cumiana to evacuate the Maira valley. Marquis de Frabosa was told to leave the Stura Valley and to reach the defensive line of Castigliole-Saluces, where the main army was waiting. The dead of Pierrelongue were buried on the battleground and the wounded were transferred to Chateau Dauphin. The French wounded were recovered in the ruins of the redoubt of Mount Cavallo.

Danois, who was now the commander, permitted his soldiers three days of looting at Bellino and Chateau Dauphin. In the early hours of the 20th, French soldiers arrived at these two villages and pillaged houses and churches. In Bellino they killed two men and in Chateau Dauphin they took the abandoned supplies of the Sardinian forces. The village of Pontechianale was saved thanks to the generosity of Danois, but it had to give 50 men who were used for eight days to transport wounded French soldiers away from the front. Givri was taken to Lyon and died a few days later from his wounds.

== Conclusion ==
While the action at Casteldelfino raged, the bulk of the Franco-Spanish army moved against the Sardinians in the Stura valley and skillfully swept past the enemy fortifications along the Stura di Demonte. The allies had reached the plains of southern Piedmont. This battle is sometimes now remembered as the "Battle of Pierrelongue", to distinguish it from the previous "Battle of Casteldelfino" (October 1743).
