= Colle di Sampeyre =

Mountain pass in Piedmont, Italy

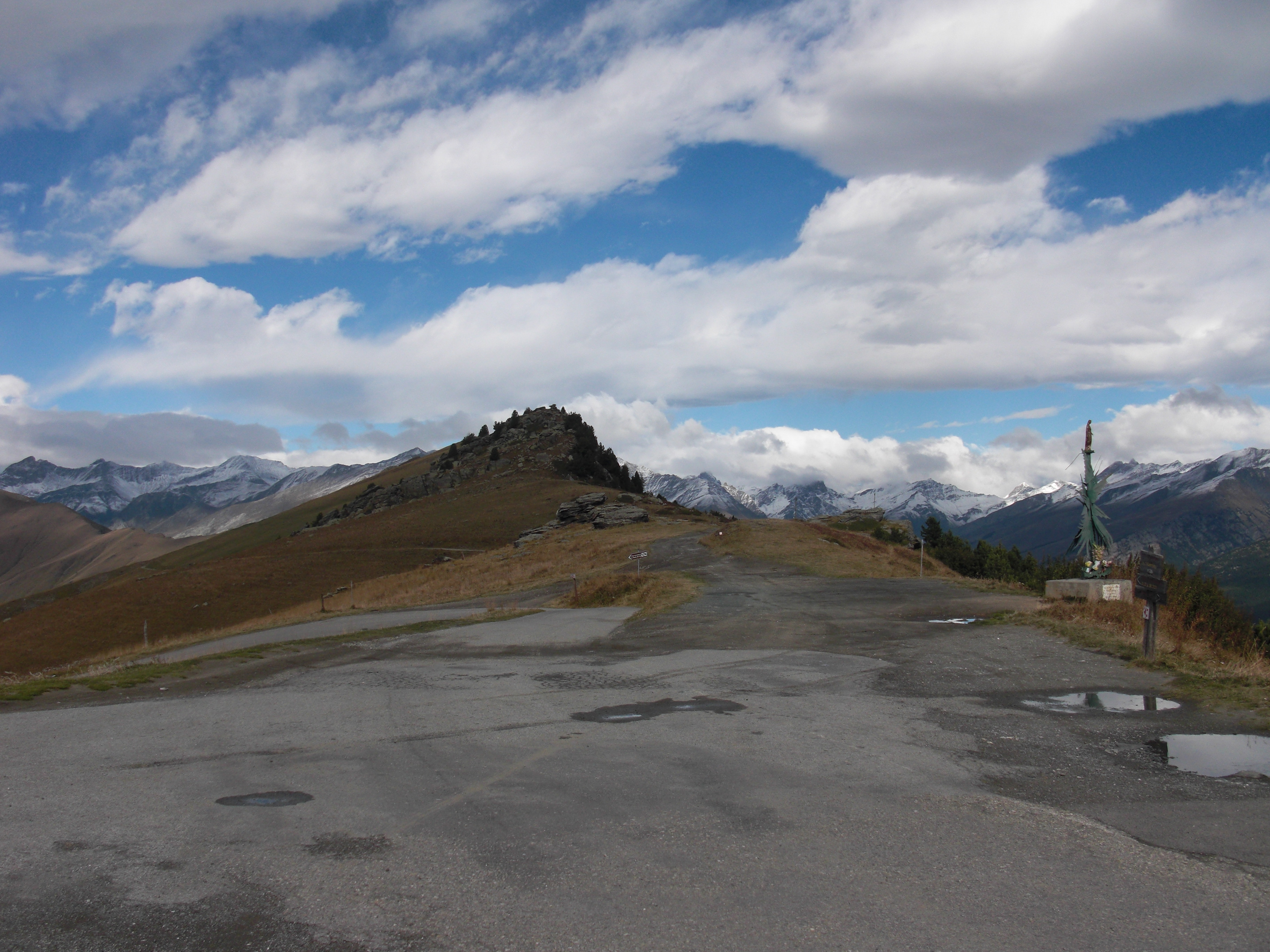
- Colle di Sampeyre

- Location within Alps
- Elevation: 2,284 m (7,493 ft)

Third Approach
- Location: Province of Cuneo, Piedmont, Italy
- Range: Cottian Alps
- Coordinates: 44°33′4″N 7°7′8″E

Colle di Sampeyre is a mountain pass in the province of Cuneo in the Cottian Alps. It connects the Varaita valley and the Maira valley.

The Colle di Sampeyre can be climbed from Stroppo, Sampeyre and Elva. It has been featured in the Giro d'Italia twice, in 1995 and 2003.

== See also ==
- List of highest paved roads in Europe
- List of mountain passes
