= Monte Birrone =

Mountain in northern Italy

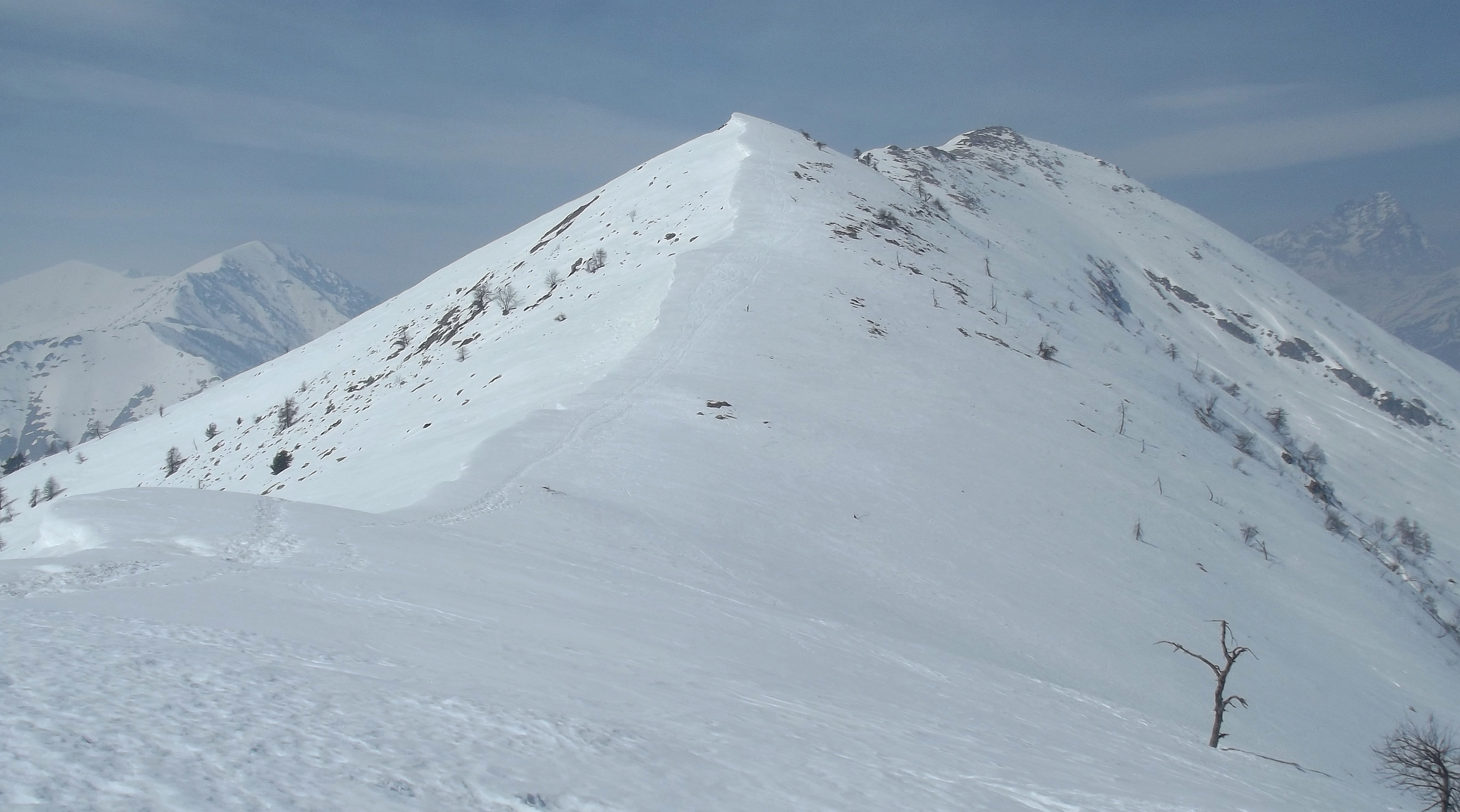
- Winter view

Highest point
- Elevation: 2,131 m (6,991 ft)
- Prominence: 431 m (1,414 ft)
- Listing: Alpine mountains 2000-2499 m
- Coordinates: 44°32′32″N 7°15′07″E

Geography
- Location within Alps
- Location: Piedmont, Italy
- Parent range: Cottian Alps

Climbing
- Easiest route: hiking

The Monte Birrone is a 2,131-metre (6,991 ft) high mountain in the Cottian Alps, in the northern Italian province of Cuneo.

== Geography ==
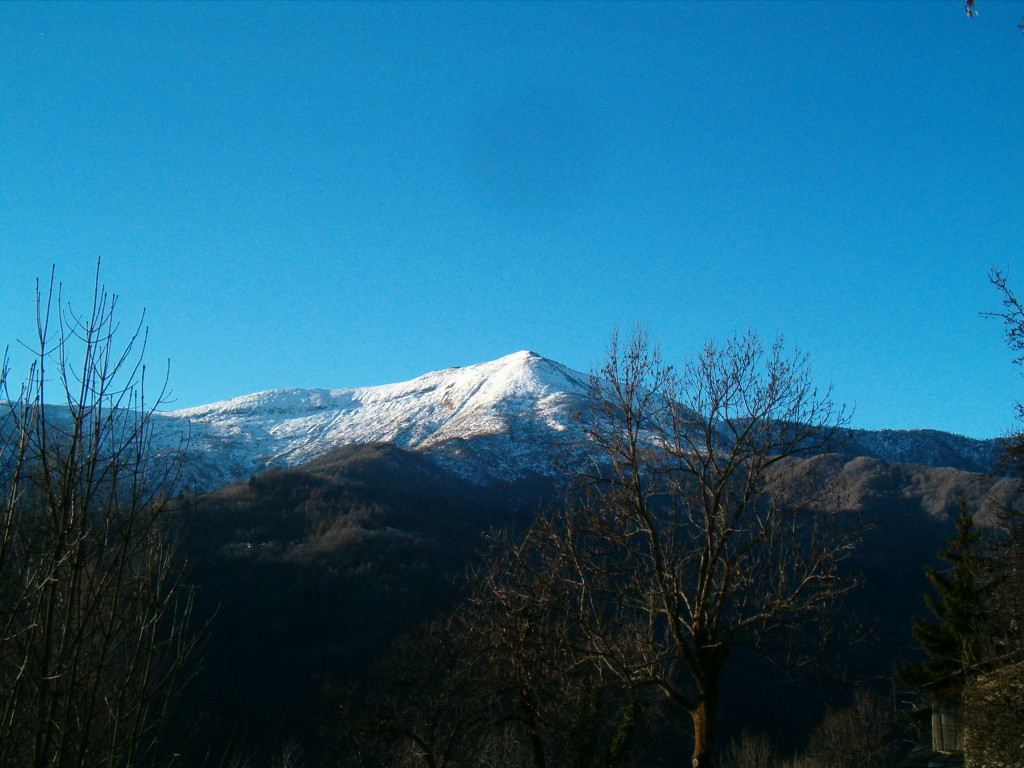
Late autumn view

The mountain stands on the long ridge which, starting from the Main chain of the Alps, divides Maira Valley from Varaita Valley. It rises between two well defined mountain passes, Colle di Birrone (West of the summit, at 1,700 m) and Colle di Melle (1,871 m, East of it). Close to the Monte Birrone passes an old military road built in order to deserve several military emplacements. It's open to cars and motorbikes during summertime. Administratively the mountain is divided between the comunes of Frassino and Sampeyre (Varaita Valley) and San Damiano Macra (Maira Valley).

=== SOIUSA classification ===
According to SOIUSA (International Standardized Mountain Subdivision of the Alps) the mountain can be classified in the following way:

- main part = Western Alps
- major sector = North Western Alps
- section = Cottian Alps
- subsection = Southern Cottian Alps ((in Italian) Alpi del Monviso)
- supergroup = Gruppo del Chambeyron in a broad sense
- group = Gruppo della Marchisa
- subgroup = Costiera del Pelvo d'Elva
- code = I/A-4.I-A.4.d

== Geology ==
From a geologic point of view, the mountain is made of ancient metamorphic rocks (pre-hercinic and hercinic) belonging to the Dora-Maira complex. W of the summit, near the colle Birrone, this kind of rocks border with schists ophiolitipher of the complex named Pietre verdi di Gastaldi (literally Green stones of Gastaldi.

== Access to the summit ==
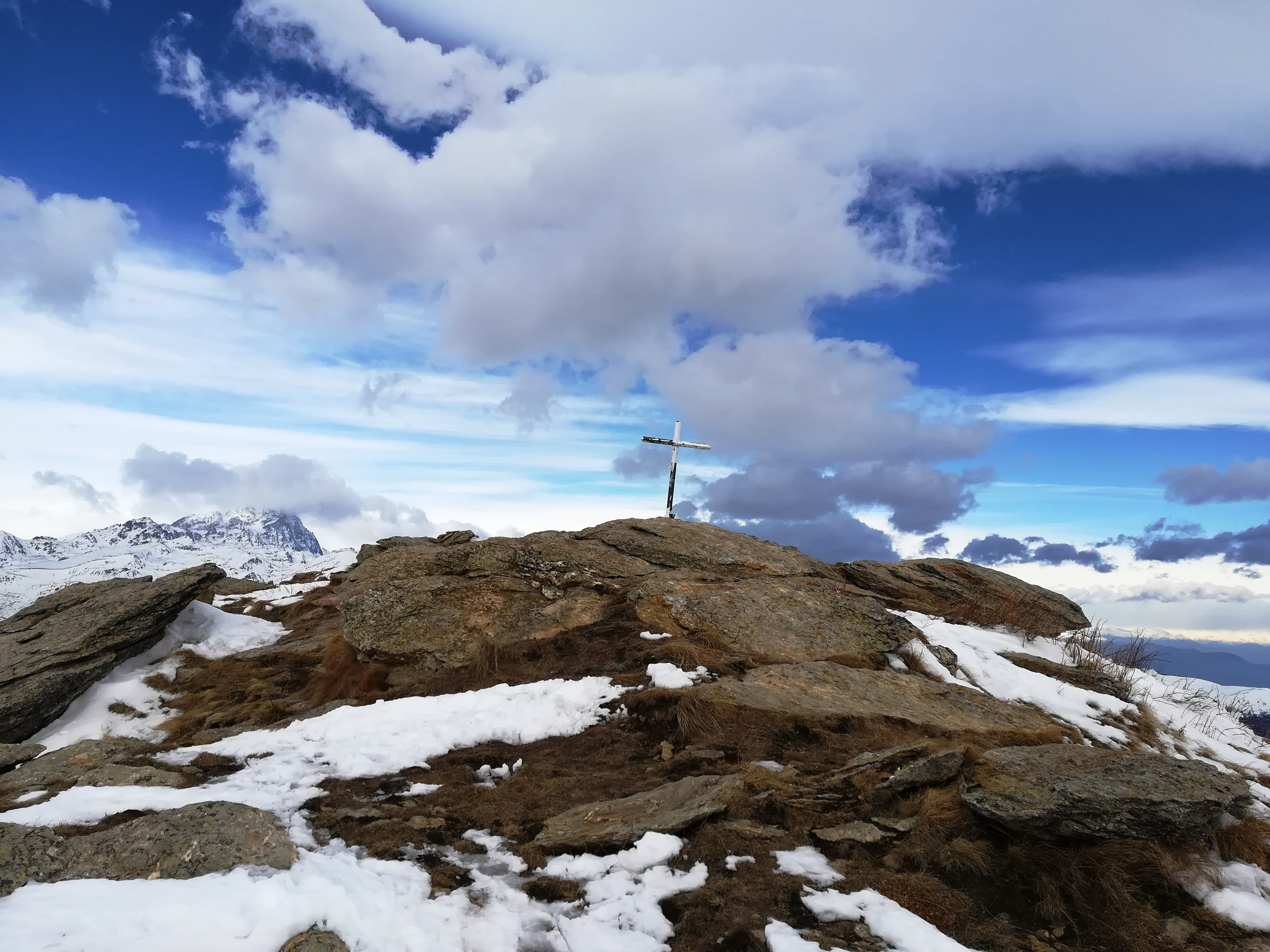
Summit cross

The summit of the Monte Birrone is easy to reach, and the normal route starts from the old military road which run close to the Maira/Varaita water divide. It's marked by a summit cross. It also can be attained by mountain bike, carrying the bike in the last part of the ascent. Besides summer hiking the Monte Birrone is also a popular winter destination for ski mountaineering and snowshoes hikes.

== Maps ==
- Italian official cartography (Istituto Geografico Militare - IGM); on-line version: www.pcn.minambiente.it
- Istituto Geografico Centrale - Carta dei sentieri e dei rifugi scala 1:50.000 n. 7 Valli Maira, Grana e Stura
