= Riberi =

Riberi is an Italian surname. Notable people with this surname include:

- Bartolomeo Riberi, O. de M. (1640–1702), Italian Roman Catholic Bishop of Nicotera
- Alessandro Riberi (1794–1861), Italian surgeon, physician, academic and Italian politician
- Antonio Riberi (1897–1967), Monacan Cardinal of the Roman Catholic Church
