= Monte Ferra =

Mountain in Piedmont, Italy

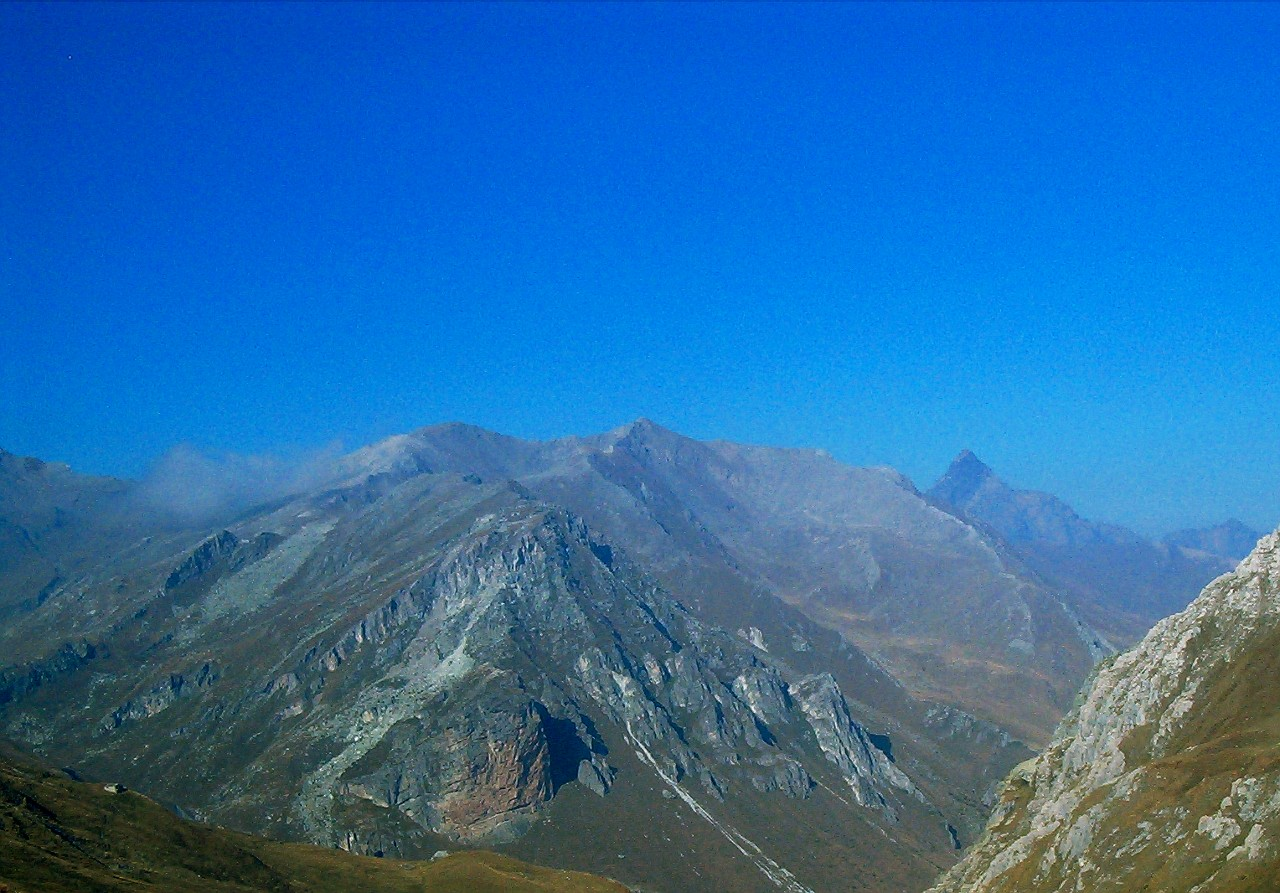
- Southern slope of Mount Ferra (center in background)

Highest point
- Elevation: 3,094 m (10,151 ft)
- Prominence: 236 m (774 ft)
- Coordinates: 44°36′07″N 6°59′06″E

Geography
- Location within Italy
- Country: Italy
- Province: Province of Cuneo
- Region: Piedmont
- Parent range: Alps

Mount Ferra (3094 m) is a mountain in the Cottian Alps, rising in Italian territory in the upper Varaita Valley, in the province of Cuneo, between the towns of Bellino and Pontechianale.

== Features ==
It lies on the ridge separating the Fiutrusa valley to the north from the Bellino Varaita valley to the south. This ridge breaks away from the main alpine watershed at Mt. Salza, and descends in a south-southeast direction to the Fiutrusa Pass (2858 m); from there it ascends in a southeast direction to the Fiutrusa Peak (3068 m). From this point, it makes an arc with the concavity to the southwest, first heading approximately eastward to elevation 3048, then southeast and south-southeast to the summit of Mount Ferra. From there the ridge makes a second, similar arc, which takes it in an east then southeast trend first to elevation 2992, from where it straightens out and proceeds in an east-northeast trend to the Bondormir pass (2651 m) and elevation 2753, where it bends southeast to reach Mount Pietralunga.

Three lateral ridges branch off from this ridge, all with a direction approximately NE-SW. The first is detached from the tip of Fiutrusa, and descends into the Rui valley, separating its upper part from the suspended valley of Vallonetto; the second descends from Mount Ferra toward Mount la Vigna (2935 m) and Mount la Pertia (2820 m), and separates Vallonetto from Cialancia, another suspended valley where Lake Reisassa is located, whose outlet, the Reisassa stream, descends into the upper Bellino valley just downstream from the hamlet of Sant'Anna. The third ridge, called Roccia Ferra, descends from elevation 2992 in a more south-southwesterly direction, separating the Cialancia from the Comba di Rocca Ferra, closed at its summit by the Colle del Bondormir.

The two main slopes of the mountain have a very different appearance. The northern slope precipitates over the Fiutrusa valley with steep, precipitous rock faces, clearly visible from Pontechianale, while to the south are fairly uniform scree slopes.

Geologically, the mountain belongs to the Permo-Carboniferous of Sampeyre, and is composed essentially of conglomeratic quartzites interbedded with mica schists and by sericitic schists, both formations dating back to the Permian. The area is affected by a number of faults with a general north-south trend, with a slightly concave trace to the west; to the east of the easternmost of these faults, toward the Bondormir pass and below the walls of the Fiutrusa valley, the Jurassic-Cretaceous ophiolitiferous calcareous schists of the Gastaldi greenstone complex emerge.

== Ascension to the summit ==
The normal route is spread over the southern slope, where the homogeneous hillside allows relatively easy access. The typical route runs from the valley of the Reisassa stream and the Cialancia; starting from Sant'Anna di Bellino, one follows first trail U65, then an unnumbered path that leads to Reisassa Lake, at the foot of the peak. One climbs the scree slope with a free path, encountering at one point a trail that leads up to the summit. The route is a hiking trail, with difficulty rated as EE.

The same route can be done in winter with snowshoes or skis.

=== Mountaineering routes ===
Mount Ferra has some interesting mountaineering routes, particularly in winter, when ice climbing is possible. One of these routes is the Y-shaped couloir on the NE buttress, which can be reached by ascending the Fiutrusa valley from Pontechianale; it is a classic ice climb, with a difficulty rating of D. A real icefall, on the other hand, is the Grassi-Tessera gully, which can be reached by ascending from Sant'Anna di Bellino to the Bondormir pass. It is a 6-rope length icefall, with long 80° sections and a vertical section in the first pitch, first climbed by Gian Carlo Grassi.

== See also ==
- Varaita Valley

== Bibliography ==
Cartography

- Official Italian cartography of the Istituto Geografico Militare (IGM) at a scale of 1:25,000 and 1:100,000, available online
- Sistema Informativo Territoriale della provincia di Cuneo, on a 1:10,000 cartographic base
- Istituto Geografico Centrale - Trail map 1:50,000 no. 6 "Monviso" and no. 106 "Monviso-Sampeyre-Bobbio Pellice"
