= Pelvo d'Elva =

Mountain in Italy

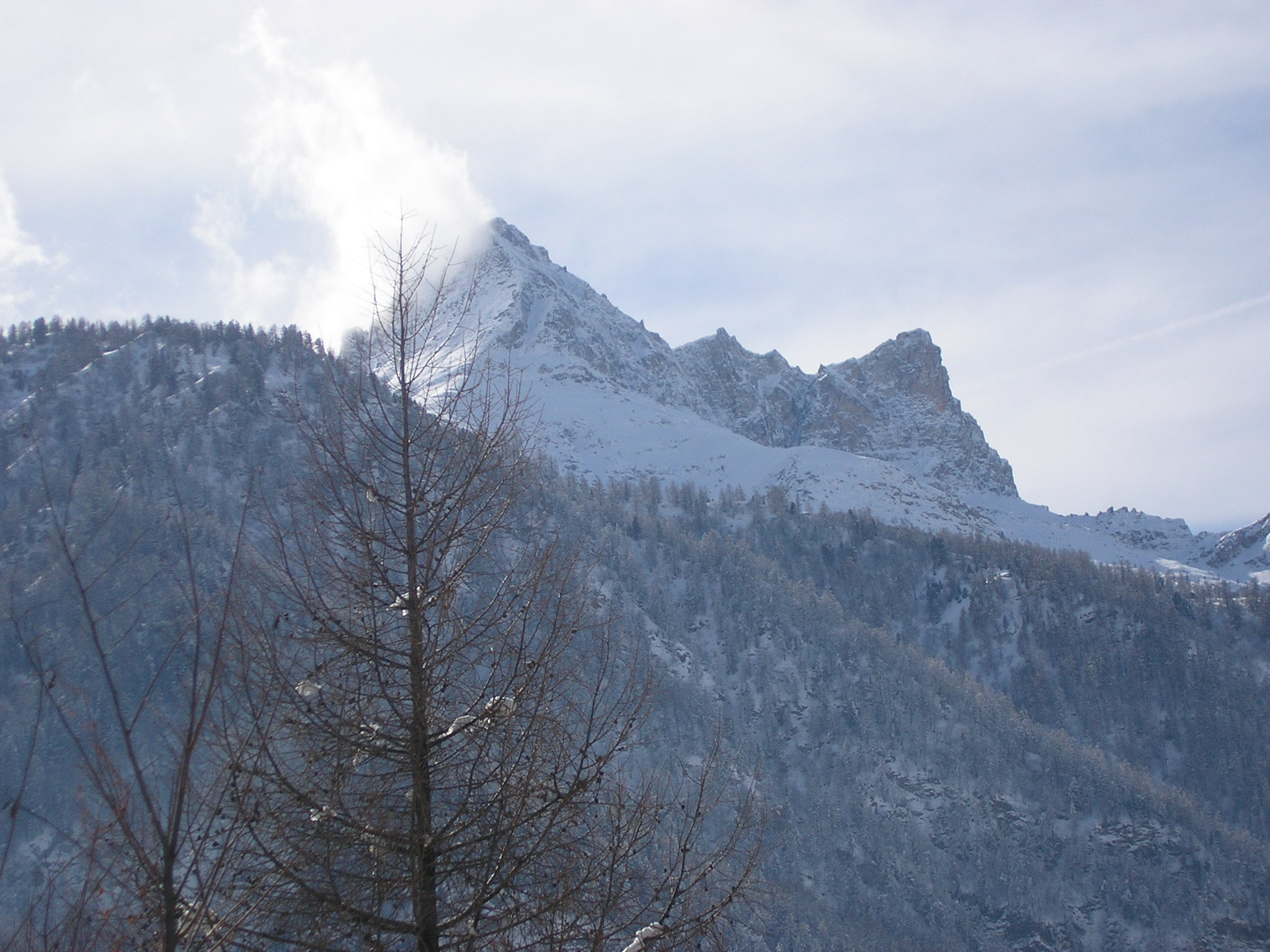
- Pelvo d'Elva seen from Casteldelfino in winter.

Highest point
- Elevation: 3,064 m (10,052 ft)
- Prominence: 177 m (581 ft)
- Isolation: 8.47 km (5.26 mi)
- Coordinates: 44°33′26″N 7°1′24″E

Geography
- Location within Italy
- Location: Piedmont, Italy
- Parent range: Cottian Alps

Pelvo d'Elva is a mountain in the Cottian Alps, in eastern Piedmont, northern Italy. It has an elevation of 3,064 metres (10,052 ft).

Dividing the Varaita and Maira Valleys, it is located across the communal territory of Elva and Bellino.
