= Mongioia =

Mountain in Italy

- Bric de Rubren, Riouburent, Cima Mongioia
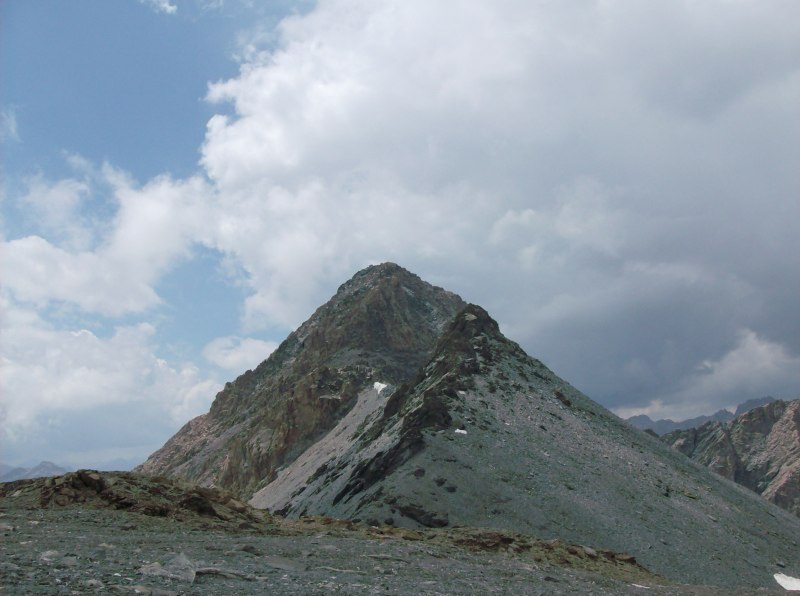

Highest point
- Elevation: 3,340 m (10,960 ft)
- Prominence: 685 m (2,247 ft)
- Listing: Alpine mountains above 3000 m
- Coordinates: 44°37′16″N 6°56′56″E

Geography
- Location within Alps
- Location: Provence-Alpes-Côte d'Azur, France; Piemonte, Italy
- Parent range: Cottian Alps

Geology
- Rock type: schists with ophiolites

Climbing
- First ascent: Paul Agnel e Joseph Risoul / July 20th 1878
- Easiest route: Hike

The Cima Mongioia or simply Mongioia (in Italian) or Bric de Rubren (in French) is a 3,340 metres high mountain of the Cottian Alps.

== Toponymy ==
In the alpinistic and geographyc literature the mountain also appears as Grand Rubren or Monte Riouburent . On French maps is usually referred as Bric de Rubren.

== Geology ==
From a geological point of view the whole upper part of the mountain belongs to a complex of schists with ophiolites of a Jurassic-Cretaceous origin. Close to the summit an area of serpentinites can be noticed.

== Geography ==
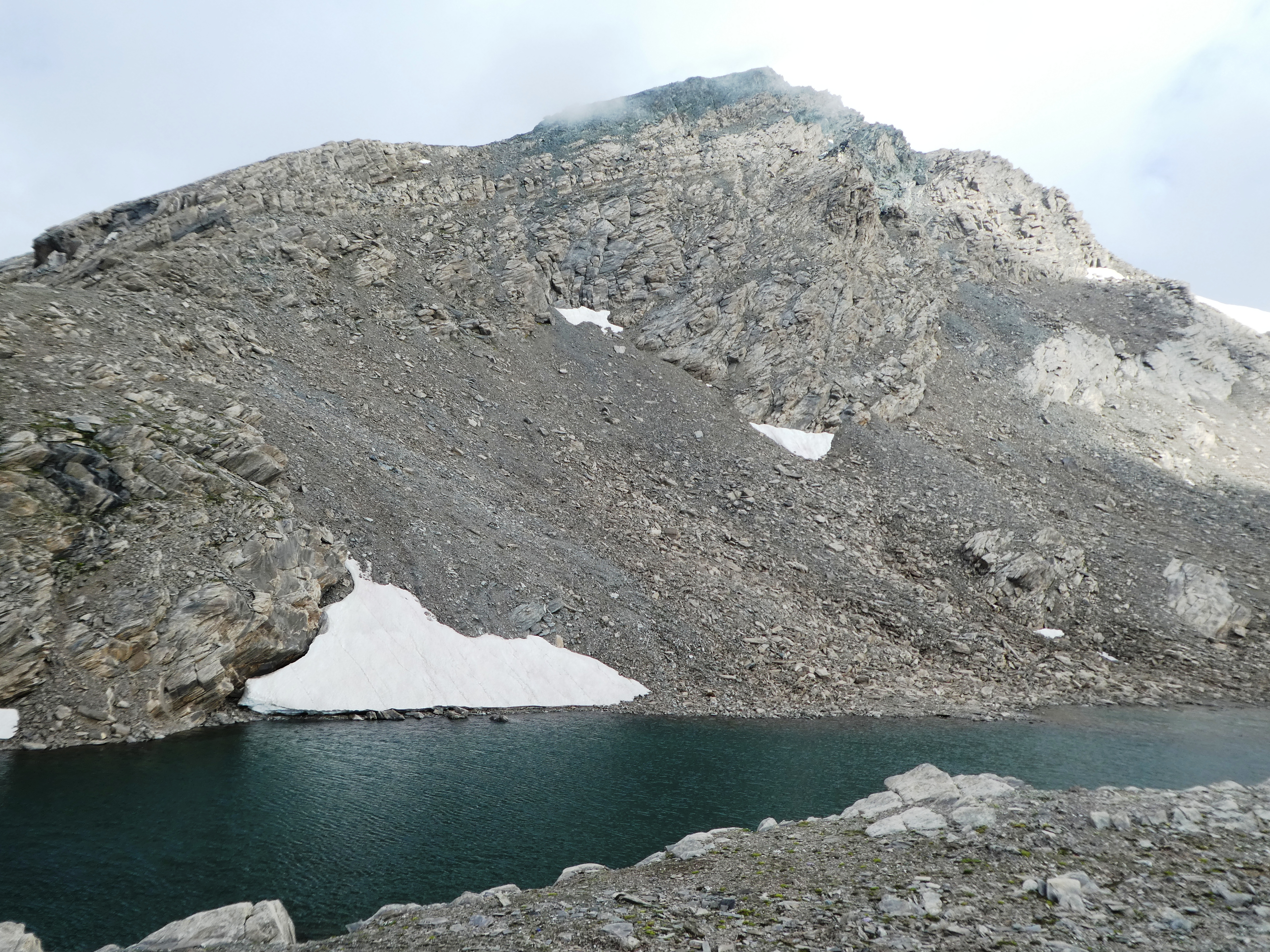
The Mongioia with the nearby lake.

The Mongioia belongs to the main chain of the Alps. Its Italian side is located in the upper part of the Varaita Valley, while the French one is at the end of the Ubaye valley.

From its summit three ridges branch out:

- the first, heading NW, divides two French dells, Vallon du Loup and Vallon de Rubren;
- the second heads South and consists in the stretch of the Alpine divide connecting the Mongioia with Passo Mongioia and Monte Giuep;
- the third, also belonging to the Alpine divide, heads East towards the Passo di Salza and Monte Salza.

The western face of Mongioia, facing the Vallon de Rubren, consists in sloping block fields, while the other faces of the mountain are steeper and rocky.

=== SOIUSA classification ===
According to SOIUSA (International Standardized Mountain Subdivision of the Alps) the mountain can be classified in the following way:

- main part = Western Alps
- major sector = South Western Alps
- section = Cottian Alps
- subsection = Southern Cottian Alps
- supergroup = Chambeyron group in the broad sense
- group = Mongioia group
- subgroup = Costiera del Mongioia
- code = I/A-4.I-A.3.a

== History ==
Mount Riouburent was considered by William Mathews the highest peak of Maritime Alps, but in his view the ridge ended north of Mongioia and not at Colle della Maddalena.

The first known attempt to climb the mountain was of the French militar topographer Loreilhe in 1823, but he didn't reach the summit. A second documented climb by François Arnaud (and the first with a detailed report) took place in 1875, and also turned unsuccessful. The summit of Mongioia was reached for the first time on the 20th of July 1878 by Paul Agnel and Joseph Risoul.

== Access to the summit ==
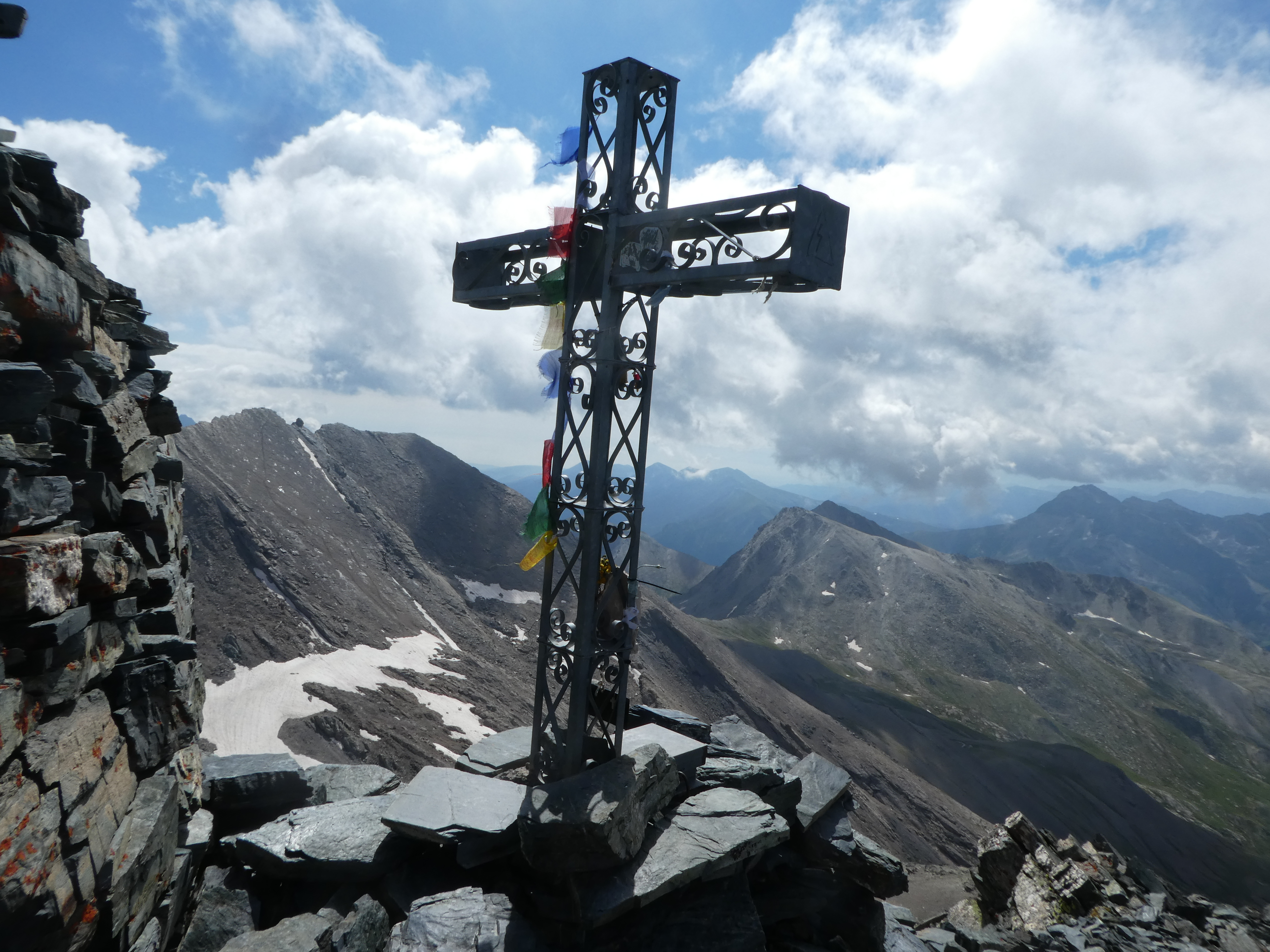
Summit cross.

From the Italian side the Mongioia can be reached starting from the village of Sant'Anna (1,850 m, Comune of Bellino). Up to the Bivacco Franco Boerio (a wooden mountain shelter built in 1991, 3,089 m) one must follow marked footpaths. From there on some passage tracks, with an easy climb passage, allow to reach the metallic cross and the trig point on the summit (way up: 4-4.30 hours from Sant'Anna).

Another route reaches the Mongioia lake through the Vallon du Loup and the Passo di Salza.

== Maps ==
- Italian official cartography (Istituto Geografico Militare - IGM); on-line version: www.pcn.minambiente.it
- French official cartography (Institut géographique national - IGN); on-line version: www.geoportail.fr
- Istituto Geografico Centrale - Carta dei sentieri e dei rifugi scala 1:50.000 n. 6 ‘’Monviso’’'
