= Varaita Valley =

Valley in Piedmont, Italy

- Valle Varaita
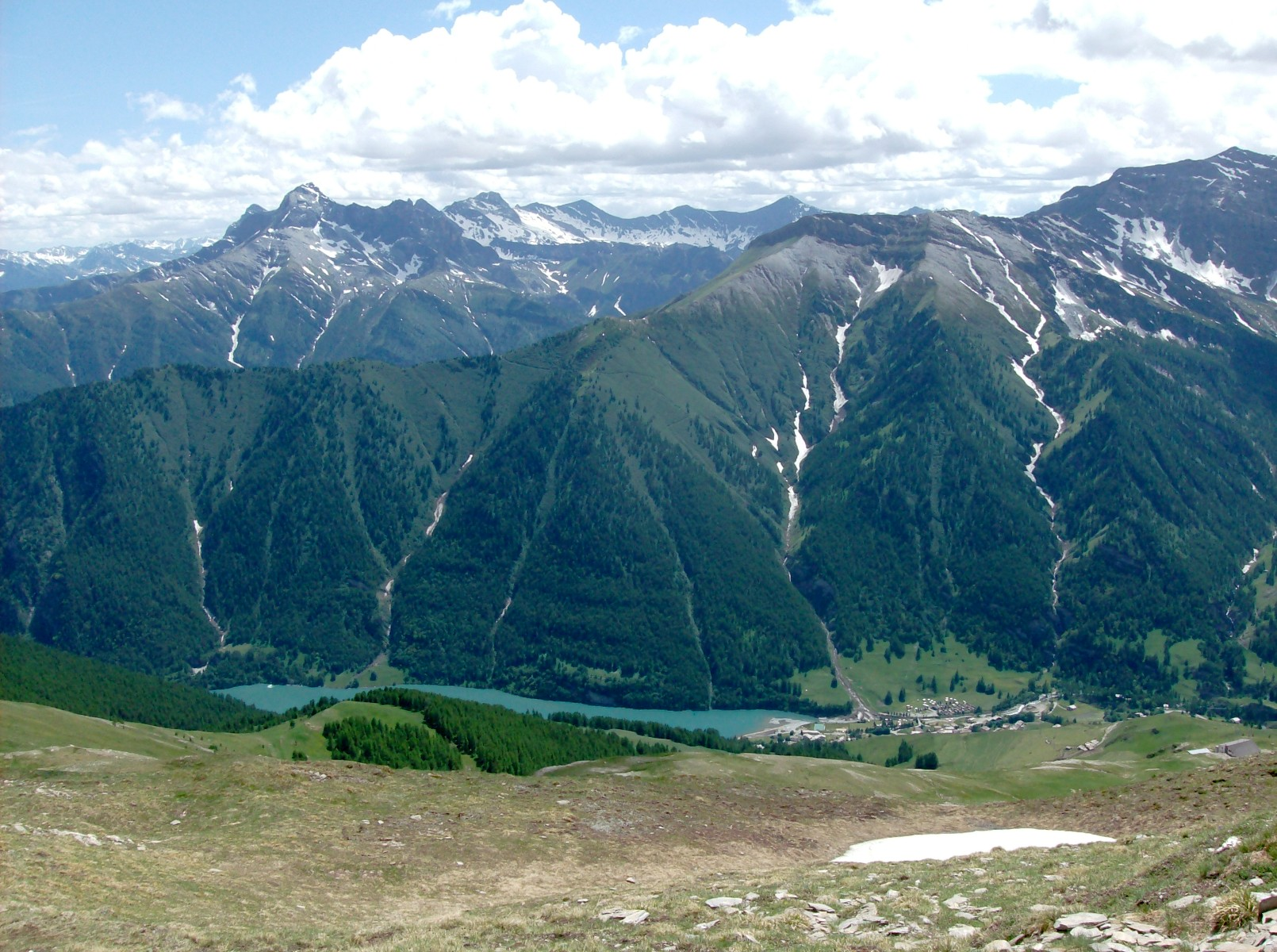
- The artificial lake of Pontechianale, in the highest part of the valley

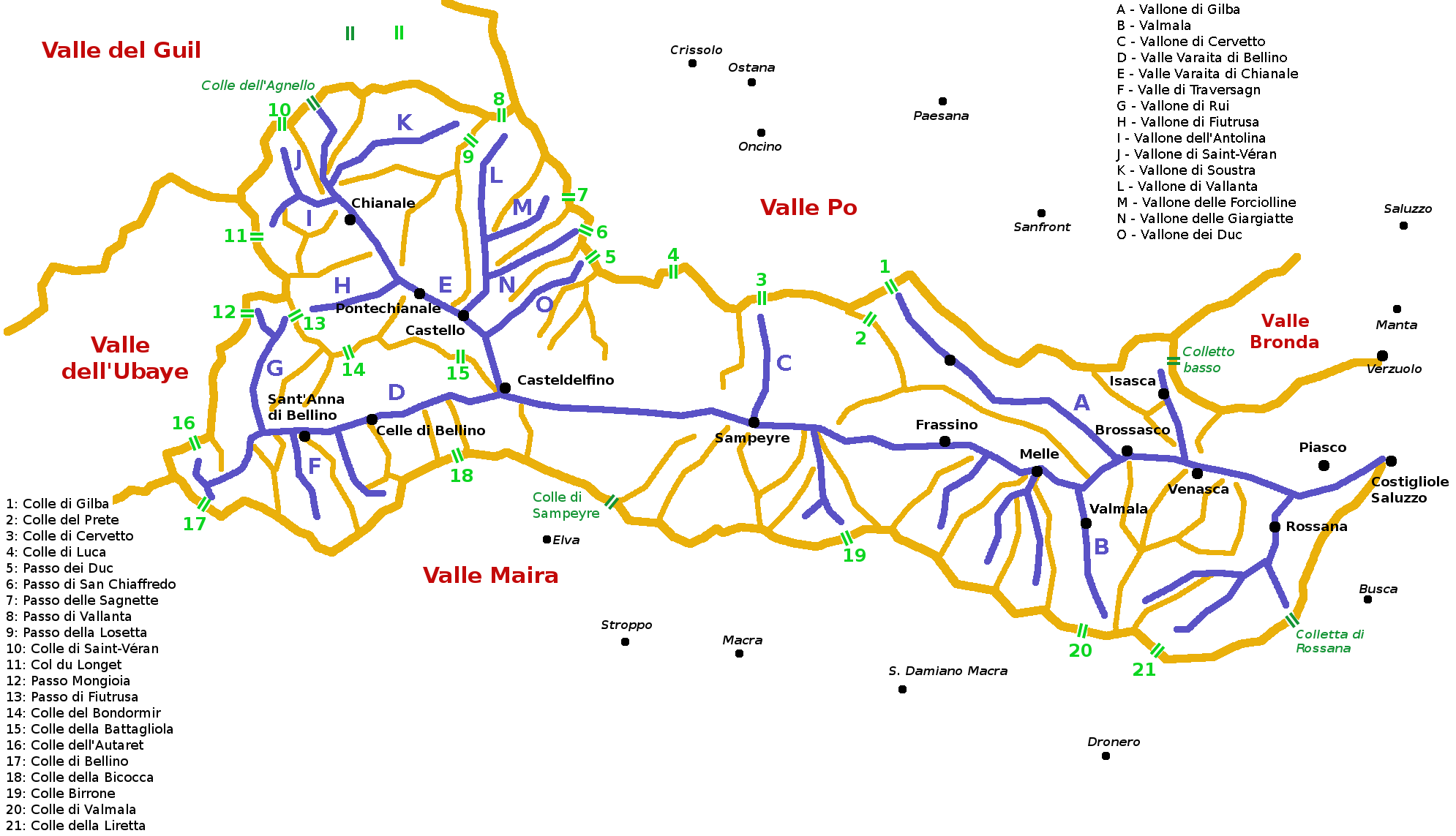
- Schematic map of the valley
- Floor elevation: 400–3,841 m (1,312–12,602 ft)
- Length: around 40 km (25 mi) west east

Geology
- Type: River valley

Geography
- Location: Piedmont, Italy
- Coordinates: 44°35′N 7°04′E

Varaita Valley (in Italian Valle Varaita) is a valley in south-west of Piedmont, in the Province of Cuneo - Italy.

== Etymology ==
It takes its name from the Varaita, a right-hand tributary of the Po which flows through the valley.

== Geography ==
Close the French border the valley is divided in two sub-valleys named Valle di Bellino (south) and Valle di Chianale (north), which meet near Casteldelfino.

The municipalities of Varaita Valley are Bellino, Brossasco, Casteldelfino, Costigliole Saluzzo, Frassino, Isasca, Melle, Piasco, Pontechianale, Rossana, Sampeyre, Valmala, Venasca and Verzuolo.

== Notable summits ==
The most important mountains of the valley are the Monviso (3.841 m) and its subpeaks.

Other relevant summits of the valley, all belonging to the Cottian Alps, are:

- Valle di Chianale:
  - Monte Losetta - 3054 m
  - Monte Ruine - 3143 m
  - Monte Aiguillette - 3298 m
  - Pic d'Asti - 3219 m
  - Rocca Bianca - 3064 m
  - Monte Pelvo - 3024 m
- Valle di Bellino:
  - Mongioia - 3340 m
  - Testa di Malacosta - 3212 m
  - Monte Ferra - 3094 m
  - Testa di Malacosta - 3212 m
  - Pelvo di Ciabrera - 3152 m
  - Pelvo d'Elva - 3046 m
- Mid and lowest part of the valley:
  - Punta Rasciassa - 2664 m
  - Monte Nebin - 2510 m
  - Testa di Garitta Nuova - 2385 m
  - Monte Birrone - 2131 m
  - Monte Ricordone - 1764 m
  - Monte san Bernardo - 1625 m

== Access ==
The valley can be reached by car/bus from Po Plain following the strada provinciale della Valle Varaita; it also can be accessed by the French region of Queyras by the Colle dell'Agnello, the third highest Alpine pass crossed by an asphalted road.

== See also ==
- Cottian Alps
