= Monte Maniglia =

Mountain on the border between Italy and France

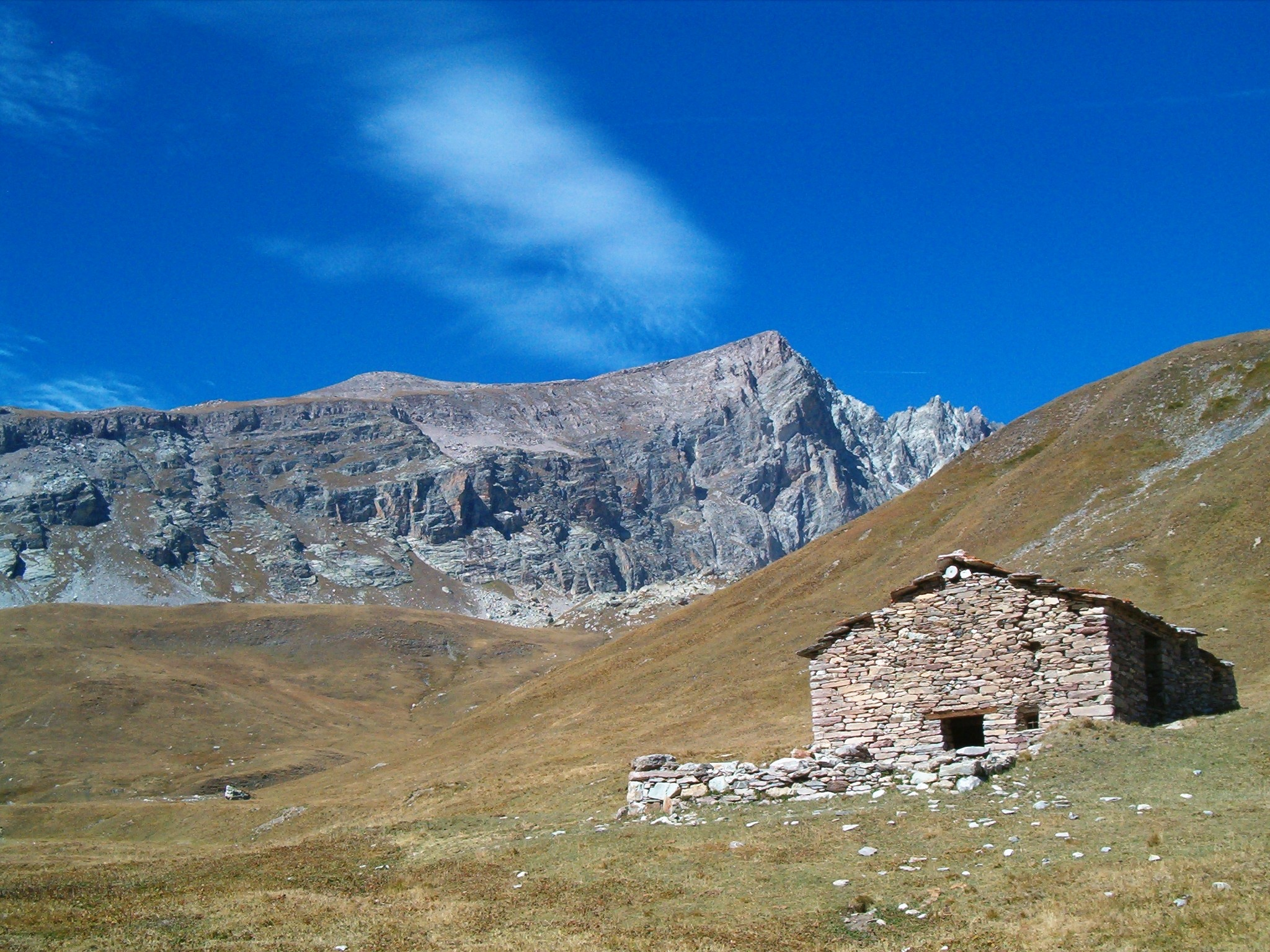
- The NE slope of Mount Maniglia, as seen from the Autaret grange.

Highest point
- Elevation: 3,177 m (10,423 ft)
- Prominence: 57 m (187 ft)
- Isolation: 5.06 km (3.14 mi)
- Coordinates: 44°33′42″N 6°54′59″E

Geography
- Location within Italy
- Countries: Italy, France
- Province: Province of Cuneo; Alpes-de-Haute-Provence
- Region(s): Piedmont; Provence-Alpes-Côte d'Azur
- Parent range: Alps

Monte Maniglia (French: Mont de Maniglia) is a mountain in the Cottian Alps, located on the border between Italy and France, between Piedmont and the Alpes-de-Haute-Provence.

== Features ==
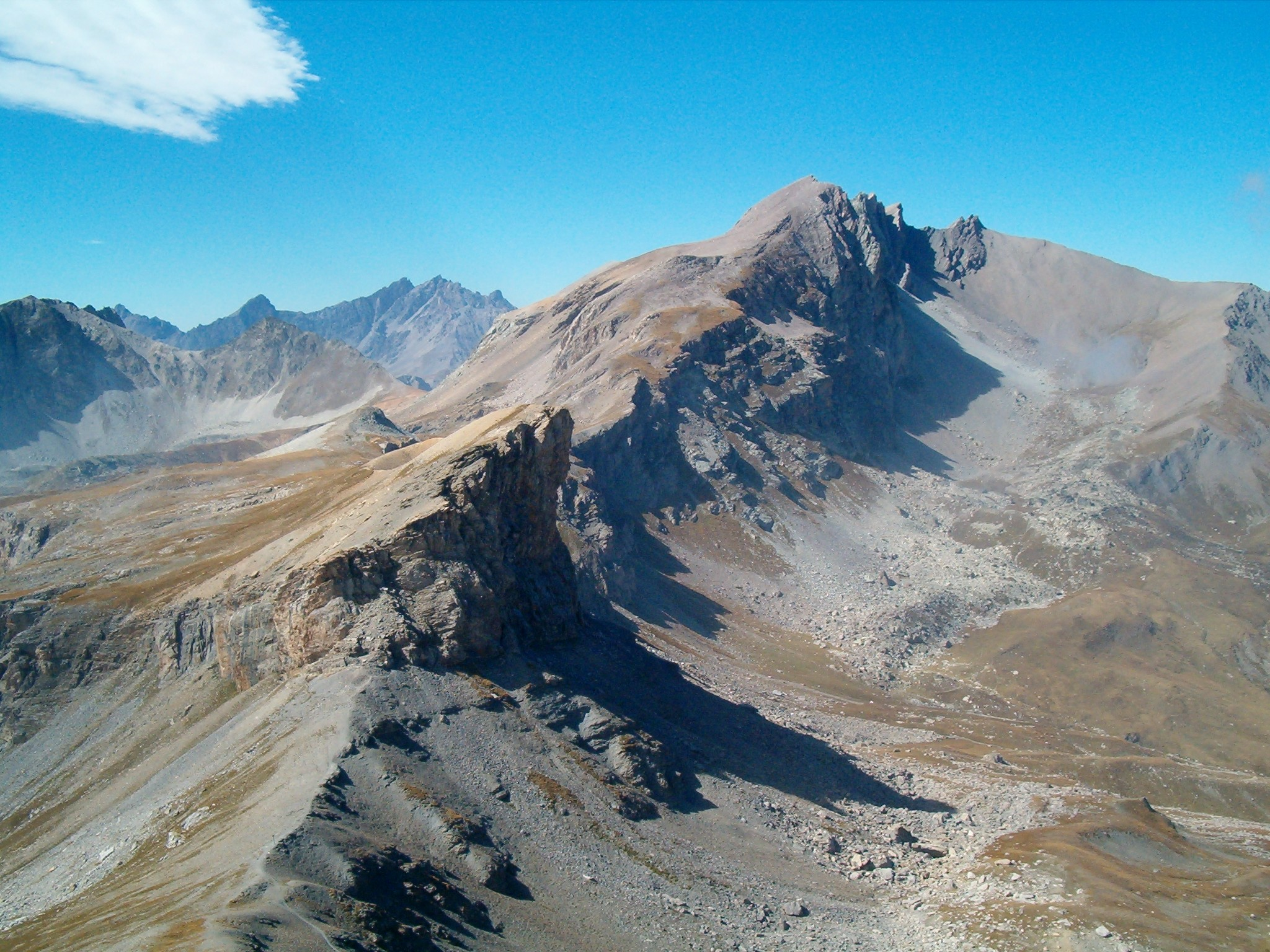
The southeast ridge of Mount Maniglia as seen from the summit of Mount Bellino.

It is located on the main alpine watershed, at an important geographic junction: in fact, the secondary alpine ridge that separates the Varaita Valley from the Maira Valley departs from its summit.

The main alpine ridge has a fairly irregular course in this area. From the nearby Tête de l'Autaret, the ridge descends westward to the Col de l'Autaret, from where it continues to the 3159 m elevation and the summit of the Denti di Maniglia (3177 m). There it bends south-southeast, reaches the summit of the Pointe du fond du Roure (3181 m) and reaches the summit of Mt. Maniglia. There it bends east-southeast again, reaches the col de Ciabriera, ascends to the mount of Ciabriera and, with a bend to the S.S.W., to the Tête de Cialancion; from there, in a wide arc first to the NW, then to the W, it descends to the Col de Roux and the Col Maurin. From the summit, it branches off precisely the secondary ridge that divides the Varaita and Maira valleys; this ridge continues in a south-southeasterly direction, continuous with the main alpine ridge upstream, and descends first to the low Terrarossa (2838 m), then rises again to the 2907 m elevation and descends again to the Col de Bellino (2804 m), from where it continues to Mt. Bellino.

The eastern slope dominates the wide basin at the base of the Autaret pass, in the upper Bellino Valley; the wall on this side is very steep. In contrast, the southern slope, which dominates the Maurin valley in the upper Maira Valley, consists of a scree slope with a constant gradient. The northwestern slope descends with steep rock walls on the Vallon de Mary, a side valley of the Ubaye Valley.

Geologically, the mountain is composed of formations from the Briançonnais zone; to the north and east, sericitic schists and quartzites of the Triassic outcrop; moving southward, there is first a range of carbonate schists, shales and breccias of the Triassic, particularly outcropping on the southwest slope, then a vast outcrop of pinkish limestones of the Jurassic.

The name comes from the Occitan word maneia, in the sense of handle, loop, and refers to the arched shape of the mountain.

It should not be confused with Denti di Maniglia, a mountain located just north on the main watershed ridge, which has the same elevation.

== Ascent to the summit ==
The normal route is a hiking route, requiring no special equipment. The classic approach involves leaving from Sant'Anna di Bellino; once on Pian Ceiol, one ascends the Barricate gorge and continues to the Autaret grange following path U27 to the Col de l'Autaret (2540 m). One climbs up toward the Col de l'Autaret to an elevation of about 2630 m, where one bends left (hydrographic right) to a poorly marked trail that leads to the Terrarossa lowlands. From there, one ascends to the right along a trail that, part on the ridge, part just below, leads to the summit. The itinerary has a difficulty rating of EE.

The low Terrarossa can also be reached from the Maira Valley, starting from the Collet grange. From there a marked path leads to the pass, from where the itinerary previously described is followed. This itinerary has a difficulty rating of EE.

The summit is also accessible in winter. Starting from the Maira Valley, it is possible to ascend with snowshoes. Ski mountaineering itineraries, on the other hand, cover both summer routes from the Varaita and Maira valleys (in this case, leaving from Chiappera instead of the Collet grange).

== See also ==
- Cottian Alps

== Bibliography ==
Cartography

- Official Italian cartography of the Istituto Geografico Militare (IGM) at scales 1:25,000 and 1:100,000, available online
- Official French cartography of the Institut géographique national (IGN), available online
- Geographical Information System of the province of Cuneo, on a 1:10,000 map basis
- Istituto Geografico Centrale - 1:50,000 Trail Map No. 6 "Monviso" and No. 7 "Valli Maira-Grana-Stura"
- Province of Cuneo - Maira Valley Mountain Community: Trail map scale 1:25,000 Maira Valley
