= Makra =

Makra may refer to:

- Makra, the Sanskrit name for crocodile is also a vyuha in the Indian epic Mahabarta
- Makra, Greece, an island in Greece
- Makra Peak, a mountain peak in Pakistan

== People ==
- László Makra (born 1952), pollen climatologist
- Noémi Makra (born 1997), Hungarian artistic gymnast
- Zsolt Makra (born 1982), Hungarian footballer

== See also ==
- Macra (disambiguation)
