= Macra (disambiguation) =

Macra is a place in Piedmont, Italy.

Macra may also refer to:

== Rivers ==
- Magra, a river in Tuscany, Italy, known in Roman times as Macra
- Maira (river), a tributary of the Po in Piedmont, Italy, also known as the Macra

== Organisations ==
- Macra na Feirme, or Macra, an Irish youth organisation
- Medicare Access and CHIP Reauthorization Act of 2015, United States legislation
- Malawi Communications Regulatory Authority (MACRA), Malawian regulatory body

== Other ==
- Macra, fictional monsters in Doctor Who first appearing in The Macra Terror
- Macra of Reims, a legendary 3rd-century Christian martyr
- Plural form of macron (diacritic)

== See also ==
- Makra (disambiguation)
- Macro (disambiguation)
