= Maira Valley =

Alpine valley in Italy

- Val Maira, Valle Macra
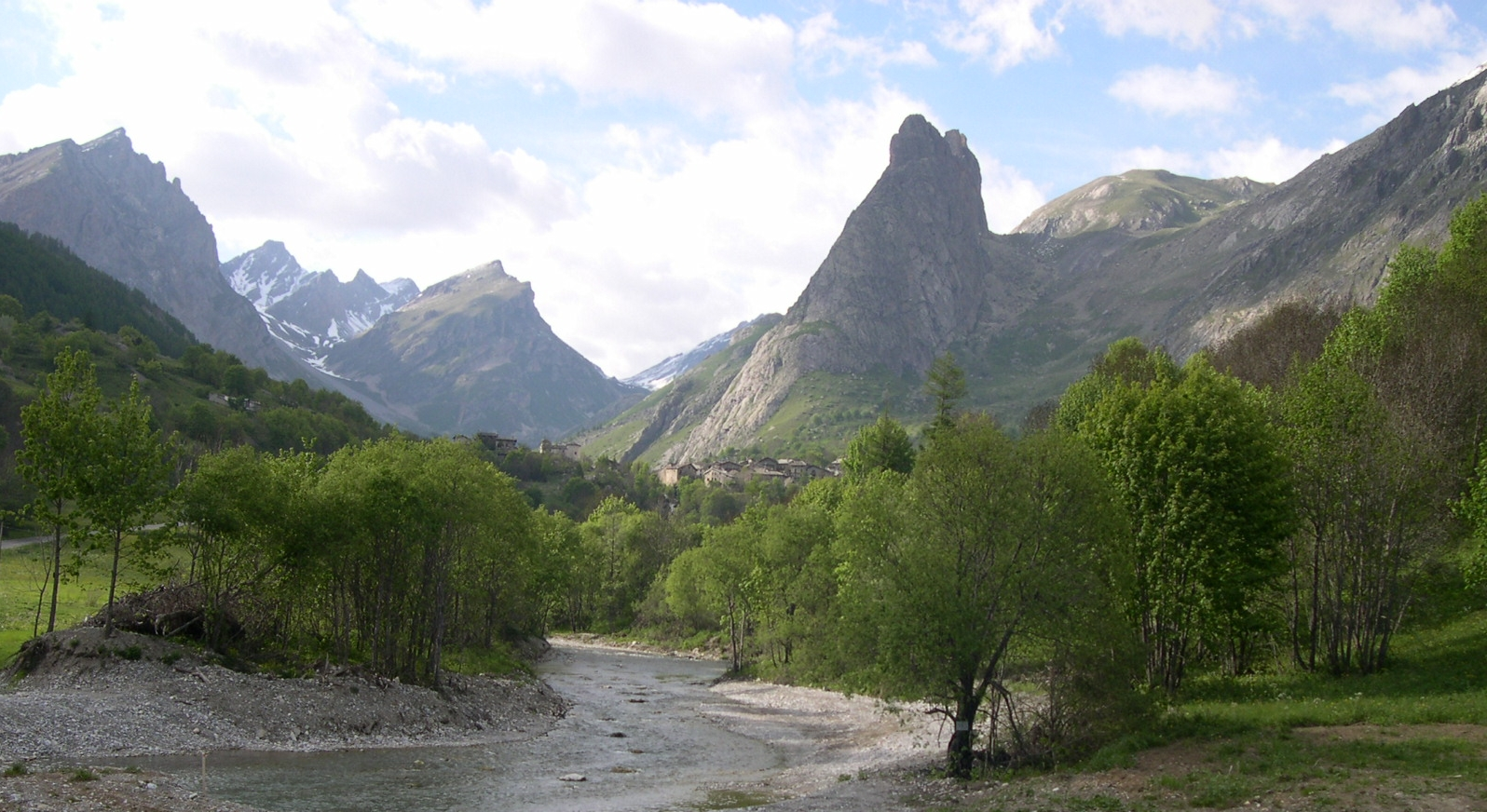
- The highest part of the valley

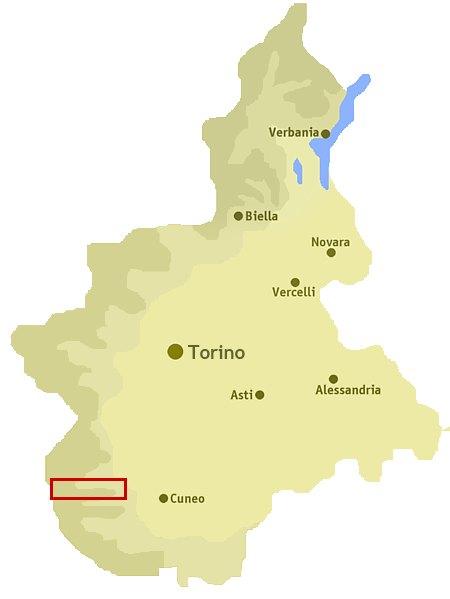
- Location of the valley in Piedmont, NW Italy
- Floor elevation: 500–3,412 m (1,640–11,194 ft)
- Length: around 45 km (28 mi) west east

Geology
- Type: River valley

Geography
- Location: Piedmont, Italy
- Coordinates: 44°30′07″N 7°08′16″E

Maira Valley (in Italian Val Maira or Valle Macra) is a valley in south-west of Piedmont in the Province of Cuneo, Italy.

== Etymology ==
The valley takes its name from the river Maira, a right-hand tributary of the Po which flows through the valley.

== Geography ==
The municipalities of the valley are Busca, Villar San Costanzo, Dronero, Roccabruna, Cartignano, San Damiano Macra, Macra, Celle di Macra, Stroppo, Elva, Canosio, Marmora, Prazzo and Acceglio.

== Notable summits ==
Among the notable summits which surround the valley (all of them belonging to the Cottian Alps) there are:

- Monte Oronaye - 3100 m
- Buc de Nubiera - 3215 m
- Brec de Chambeyron - 3412 m
- Tête de la Frema - 3143 m
- Monte Chersogno - 3026 m
- Pelvo d'Elva - 3064 m
- Rocca la Marchisa - 3072 m
- Monte Maniglia - 3177 m
- Monte Sautron - 3166 m
- Rocca la Meja - 2831 m
- Punta Tempesta - 2679 m
- Monte Birrone - 2131 m

== See also ==
- Cottian Alps
- Monte Oronaye
