= Celle di Macra =

- Comune
- Comune di Celle di Macra
- Location within Italy Location within Piedmont
- Coordinates: 44°29′N 7°11′E
- Country: Italy
- Region: Piedmont
- Province: Cuneo (CN)
- Frazioni: Albornetto, Ansoleglio, Bassura, Castellaro, Chiesa, Chiotto, Combe, Grangia, Matalia, Paschero, Rio, Ruà, Sagna, Serre, Soglio Soprano, Soglio Sottano, Ugo Soprano, Ugo Sottano

Government
  - Mayor: Michelangelo Ghio

Area
  - Total: 31.11 km^{2} (12.01 sq mi)
- Elevation: 1,270 m (4,170 ft)

Population (31 December 2017)
  - Total: 94
  - Density: 3.0/km^{2} (7.8/sq mi)
- Demonym: Cellesi
- Time zone: UTC+1 (CET)
  - Summer (DST): UTC+2 (CEST)
- Postal code: 12020
- Dialing code: 0171
- Patron saint: St. John the Baptist
- Saint day: June 24
- Website: Official website

Celle di Macra (sometimes ‘Celle Macra’) is a comune (municipality) in the Province of Cuneo, region of Piedmont, Italy. It is located about 80 kilometres (50 mi) southwest of Turin and about 30 kilometres (19 mi) northwest of Cuneo. At the end of 2017 it had a population of 94.

Celle di Macra borders the following municipalities: Castelmagno, Macra, Marmora and San Damiano Macra.

The churches of San Giovanni has a 1496 polyptych by the Flemish master Hans Clemer, who worked in the court of the Marquis of Saluzzo.

Image of the church
