= Pachia (Anafi) =

Uninhabited islet in Greece

Native name: Παχειά
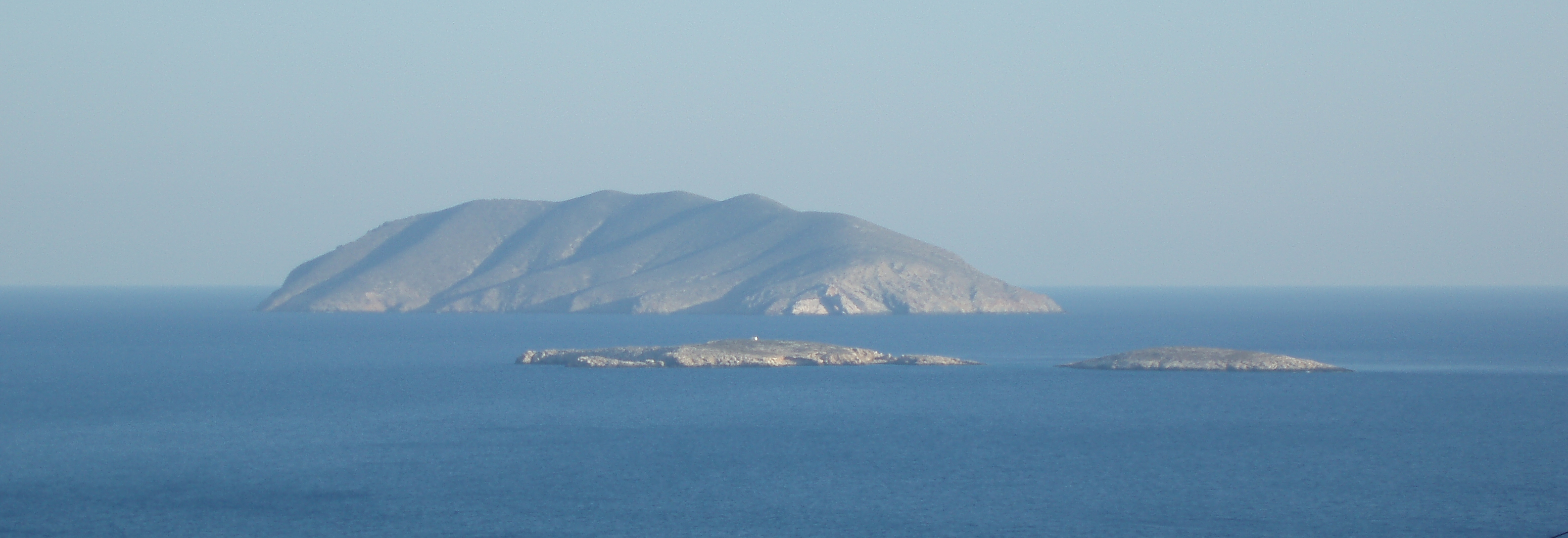
- Pachia, behind the smaller Ftena Islands
- Interactive map of Pachia

Geography
- Coordinates: 36°16′N 25°50′E
- Archipelago: Cyclades

Administration
- Greece

Pachia (Greek: Παχειά) is an islet in the Cyclades in Greece.

It is to the south of Anafi. It lies close to the smaller Makra.

There is another islet in the Cyclades named Pachia near Nisyros.
