= Varaita =

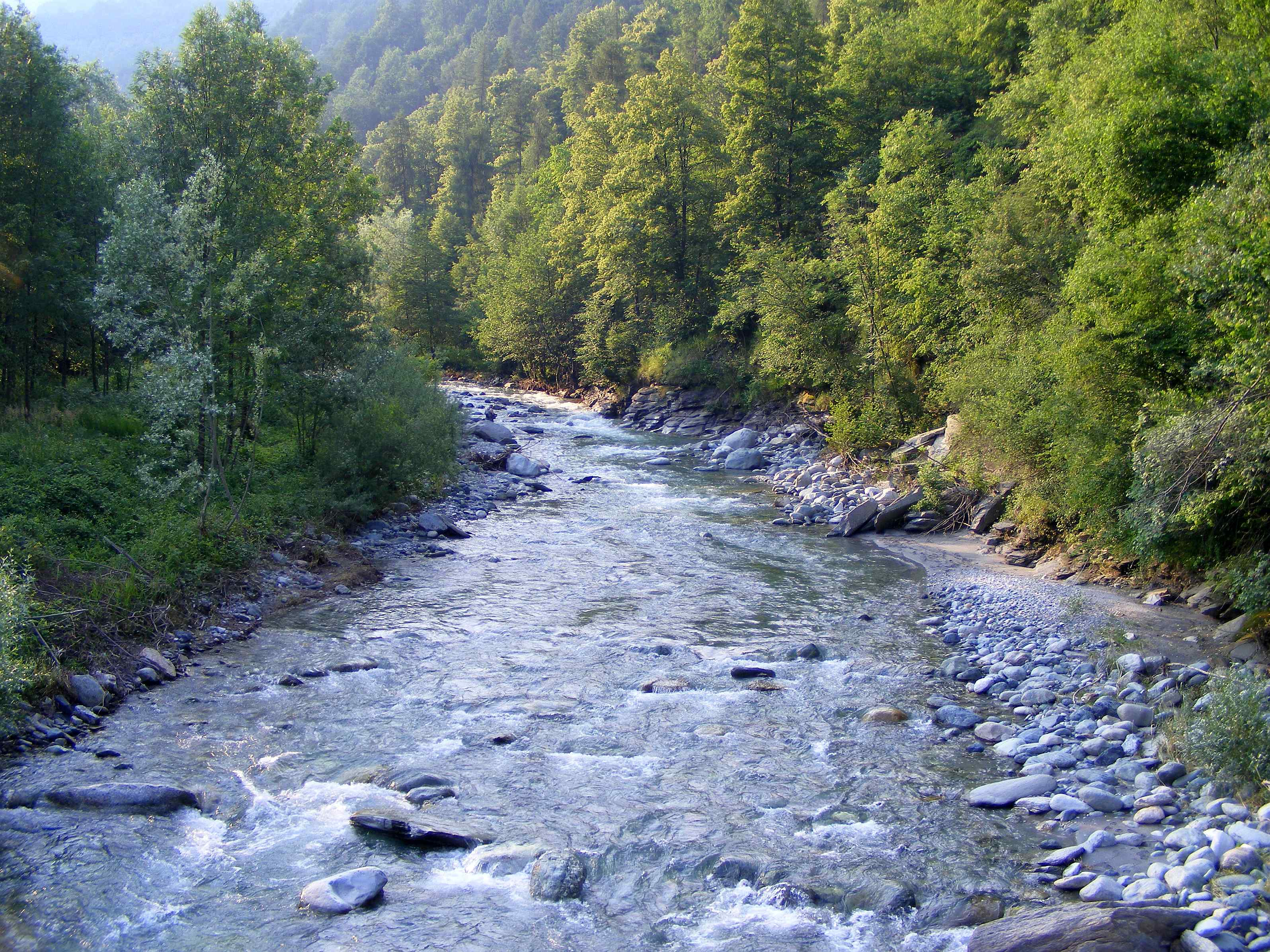
- Varaita near Melle (CN)

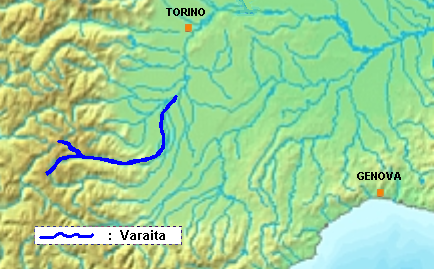
- Native name: Vràita (Piedmontese); Varacho (Occitan)

Location
- Country: Italy

Physical characteristics
- Source
  - location: Monviso
  - elevation: about 2,500 m (8,200 ft)
- Mouth
  - location: Po River near Casalgrasso
  - coordinates: 44°49′16″N 7°36′28″E
- Length: 75 km (47 mi)
- Discharge
  - average: 12 m^{3}/s (420 cu ft/s)

Basin features
- Progression: Po→ Adriatic Sea

The Varaita (Italian pronunciation: [vaˈraita]; Piedmontese: Vràita [ˈvrɑi̯ta]; Occitan: Varacho [vaˈɾatʃu]) is a 75-kilometre (47 mi) river of the Province of Cuneo in northwest Italy. It is the first right tributary of the Po River.

== Geography ==
The river springs at an elevation of some 2,500 metres (8,200 ft) on the slopes of Monviso, in the Cottian Alps near the French border, then proceeds through the valley named after it—the Valle Varaita—where it passes through centres including Frassino, Sampeyre, Brossasco and Costigliole Saluzzo. Having entered the plains of the Po Valley it joins the Po near Casalgrasso.

== Regime ==
The regime is typical of an Alpine torrent: the flow is at its greatest in spring and in autumn while being drastically reduced during the summer. The mean discharge at its confluence with the Po is about 12 cubic metres per second (420 cu ft/s).

== Notes ==
This article was originally translated from its counterpart in the Italian Wikipedia, specifically from this version.
