= Alessandro Riberi =

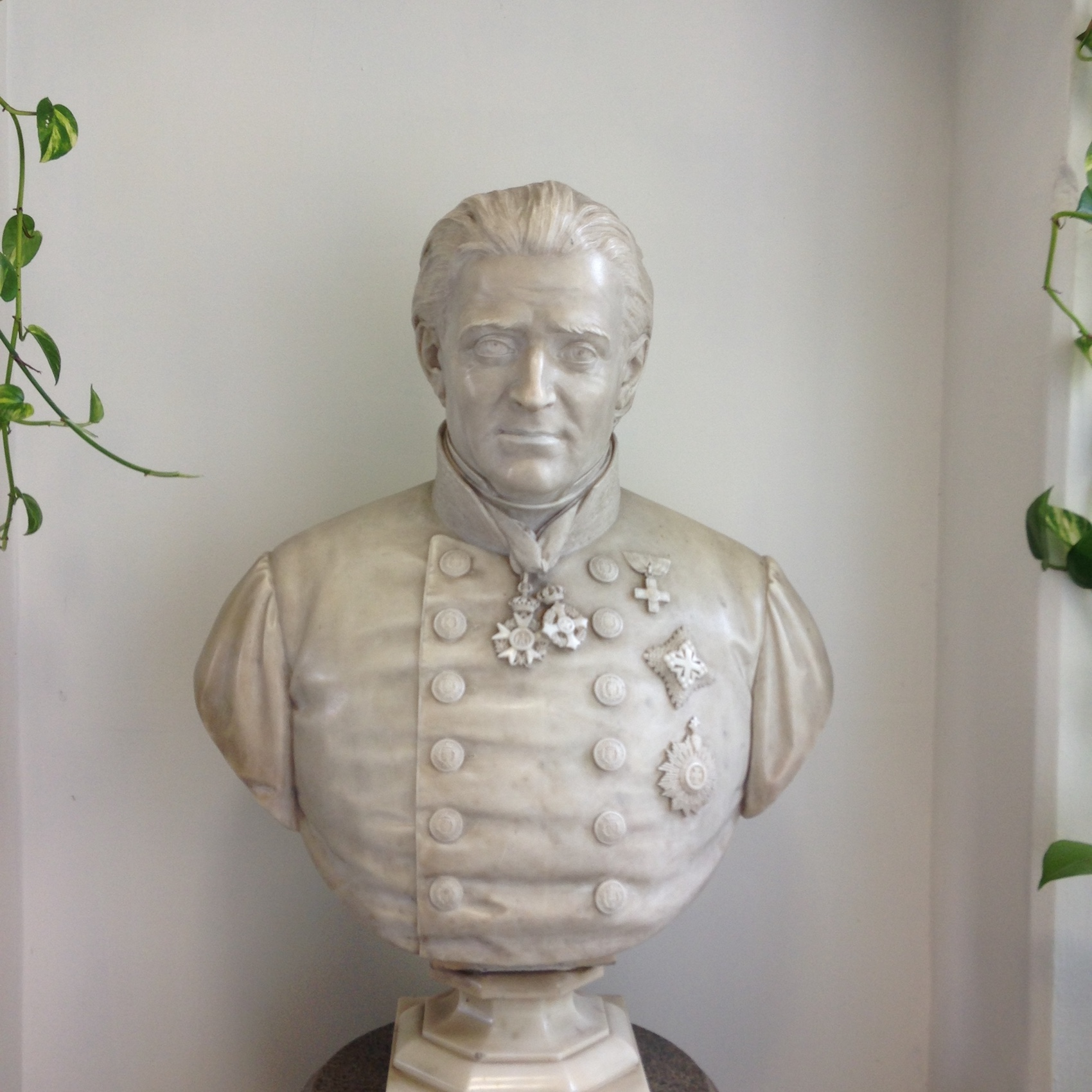
- Alessandro Riberi's bust in Turin
- Born: 24 April 1794; Stroppo, Italy
- Died: 18 November 1861 (aged 67); Cuneo, Italy
- Scientific career
- Fields: Medicine, politics

Alessandro Riberi (Stroppo, 24 April 1794 – Cuneo, 18 November 1861) was a surgeon, medical doctor, academic and Italian politician. He was considered to be the most distinguished Italian physician of his time. He founded the Italian army medical corps.

== Biography ==
Alessandro Riberi was born on 24 April 1794 in Stroppo. He graduated at the University of Turin in Surgery in 1815 and then in Medicine at the University of Genoa in 1817. In 1820 he became assistant in the clinic of San Giovanni Hospital. In 1822 he was appointed assistant surgeon and anatomic engraver in the same hospital. In the same year he was named major surgeon by King Charles Felix. In 1826 he became operative surgery and obstetrics professor and then he founded the Laboratory of Anatomy and Surgery. When Charles Albert became the King of Sardinia in 1831, Riberi was appointed surgeon of the Royal House.

In 1843 he was named president of the Major Military Council of Health and he founded the Giornale di Medicina Militare. He successfully support enaction of a law requiring all military physicians to be surgeons as well. He introduced the use of anesthesia in hospitals. In 1848 he was appointed member of the Council of Dronero and the next year he became a member of the Italian Senate. In 1848 he became counselor of the king and then member of the Superior Council of Education. In 1849 he went to Oporto to cure his dying friend Charles Albert. He was a member of the Superior Council of Health, board of directors of the clinic of San Giovanni Hospital, the Work of Motherhood Administration and of Charity General Hospice in Turin. He was also a member of the French Académie nationale de médecine, the St. Petersburg Imperial Medical and Surgical Academy, the Accademia Fisio-Medico-Statistica di Milano, Marsiglia Academic Society of Medicine, and the Barcelona and Lisbon Medical Societies. He was president of the faculty of Medicine and Surgery of the University of Turin. He was a skillful surgeon. Riberi's students could admire his safety, his calm, his foresight and his orderliness during surgical operations. In 1861 he tried to treat in vain Camillo Benso, Count of Cavour.

He never married. In the last years of his life he opened a pathological museum in San Giovanni Hospital in which he had been surgeon for thirty-five years. He renounced his salary to improve the hospital. He died in 1861 as a result of entero rheumatic peritonitis. He is buried in the Monumental Cemetery of Turin.

== Selected works ==
Riberi was a prolific writer.

Some of his treatises have been digitized, including:

Sulla cancrena contagiosa; o, Nosocomiale con alcune cenni sopra una risipola contagiosa (1820)

Trattato di blefarottalmo-terapia operativa (1836)

Dei seni e delle fistole in genere e delle principali malattie delle vie lagrimali colle operazioni che le ragguardano (1832)
