= Elva, Piedmont =

Elva
- Comune
- Comune di Elva
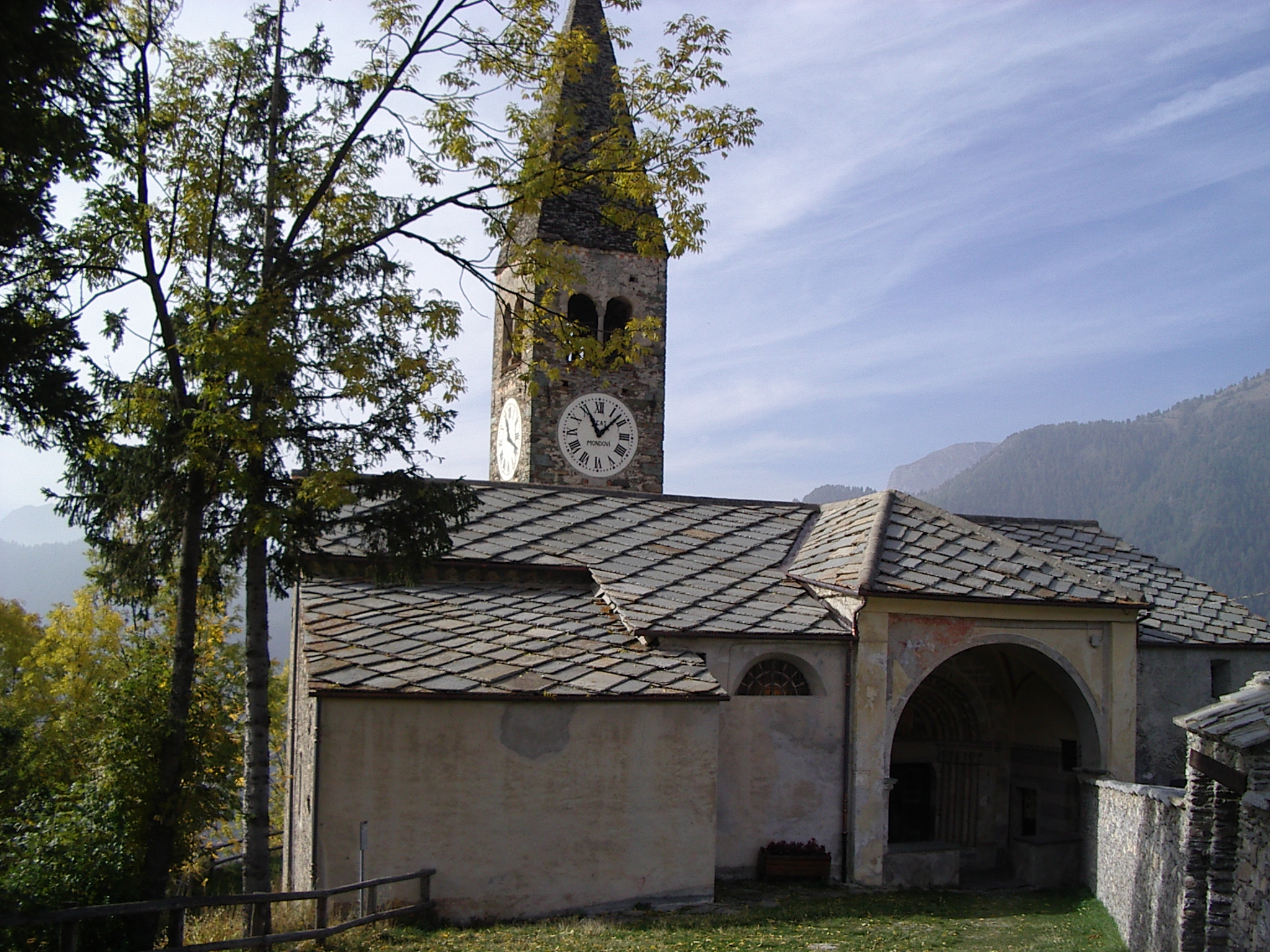

- Location within Italy Location within Piedmont
- Coordinates: 44°32′N 7°5′E
- Country: Italy
- Region: Piedmont
- Province: Cuneo (CN)
- Frazioni: Baletti, Baudini, Brione, Castes, Chiosso di Mezzo, Chiosso Sottano, Chiosso Superiore, Clari, Dao, Goria Abelli, Goria di Mezzo, Goria Superiore, Goria Ugo, Grange Garneri, Grange Laurenti, Grange Viani, Grangette, Isaia, Lischia, Martini, Mattalia, Maurelli, Molini Abelli, Molini Allioni, Reynaudo, Rossenchie, Serre (communcal capital), Villar

Government
  - Mayor: Laura Lacopo

Area
  - Total: 26.5 km^{2} (10.2 sq mi)
- Elevation: 1,637 m (5,371 ft)

Population (31 December 2010)
  - Total: 102
  - Density: 3.85/km^{2} (9.97/sq mi)
- Time zone: UTC+1 (CET)
  - Summer (DST): UTC+2 (CEST)
- Postal code: 12020
- Dialing code: 0171

Elva is a comune (municipality) in the Province of Cuneo in the Italian region Piedmont, located about 80 kilometres (50 mi) southwest of Turin and about 40 kilometres (25 mi) northwest of Cuneo.

Elva borders the following municipalities: Bellino, Casteldelfino, Prazzo, Sampeyre, and Stroppo. The Pelvo d'Elva mountain is located in the communal territory.

Flemish painter Hans Clemer was active here: some of his works can be seen in the late-Romanesque parish church.
