= Makra, Greece =

Island in Greece

Coordinates: 36°03′N 26°24′E

Makra is an islet in the Cyclades in Greece.

It is to the south of Anafi. It lies close to the larger Pachia.
