= Hans Clemer =

French painter

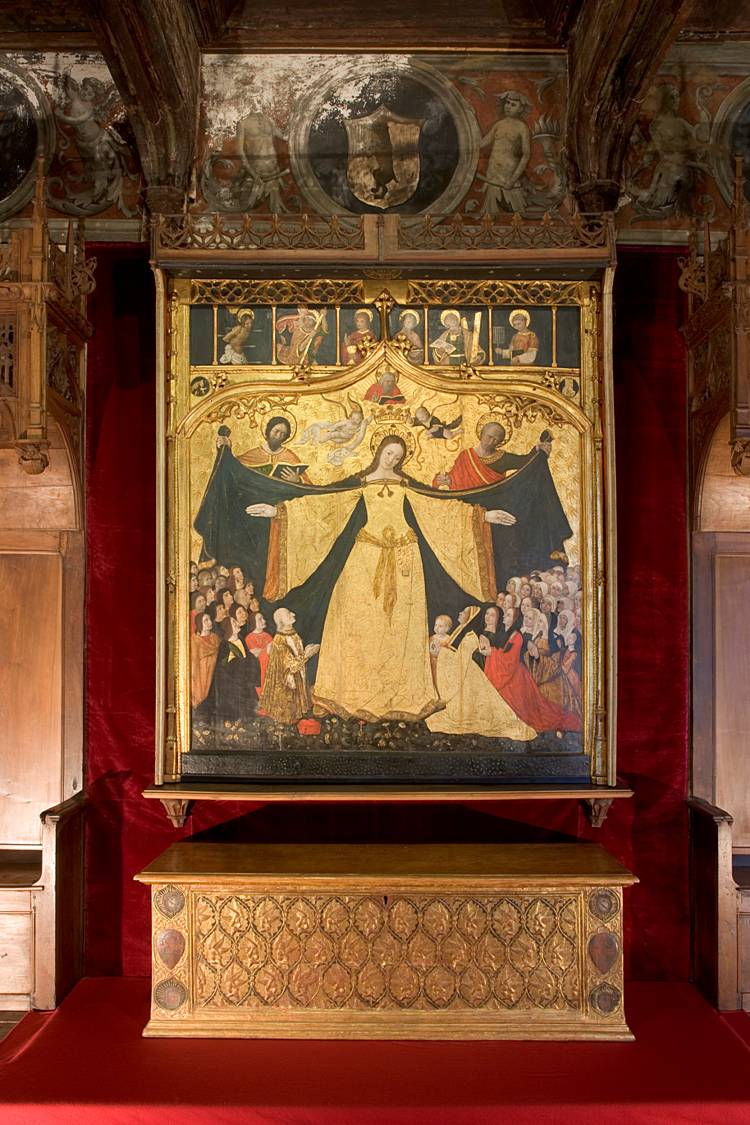
Altarpiece of Our Lady of Mercy in the Cavassa house, Saluzzo (1499/1500)

Hans Clemer was a French painter of Flemish origin who worked most of his career at Piedmont.

There is little documentation of the birth of Hans Clemer. The first records date from the late fifteenth century. The artistic career of Hans Clemer shows an articulate culture, attentive to innovative technical solutions, in which there are references to his contemporary Giovanni Martino Spanzotti. A document found in Aix-en-Provence, speaks about two painters, Josse Lieferinxe and Mestre Ans and contains an agreement between the two artists, linked by kinship and the leader of the Brotherhood of St. Anthony of Padua, the monastery of Aix, for the realization of a work representing the saint. To the end of the fifteenth century Clemer seems to be already in service in the valleys of the marquisate of Saluzzo and in particular, in Maira Valley, in the parish church of Elva, in which it is possible to see the cycle of frescoes depicting scenes from the life of Mary and a Crucifixion, dating from 1493. Those two works are still well preserved in the choir and apse of the church, a beautiful building in the style of the late Romanesque period. This masterpiece has earned him the title of Master of Elva, but the artist's presence in much of the territory of the marquisate is proved by a series of works ranging from the religious subject to historical and mythological representations. Soon, he was called to work even in the capital of the marquisate: Saluzzo. Here Hans Clemer made his last works commonly dated to the period 1511–1512. Beyond the paintings on the facade of the cathedral of Saluzzo, Clemer also created the decoration of the house and the magnificent Altarpiece of Our Lady of Mercy in the Cavassa house.

== Bibliography ==
- (in Italian) Giovanna Galante Garrone e Elena Ragusa, (2002), HANS CLEMER, il Maestro d'Elva, ed. L'Artistica, Savigliano, ISBN 88-7320-044-3.
