= Casteldelfino =

- Comune
- Comune di Casteldelfino
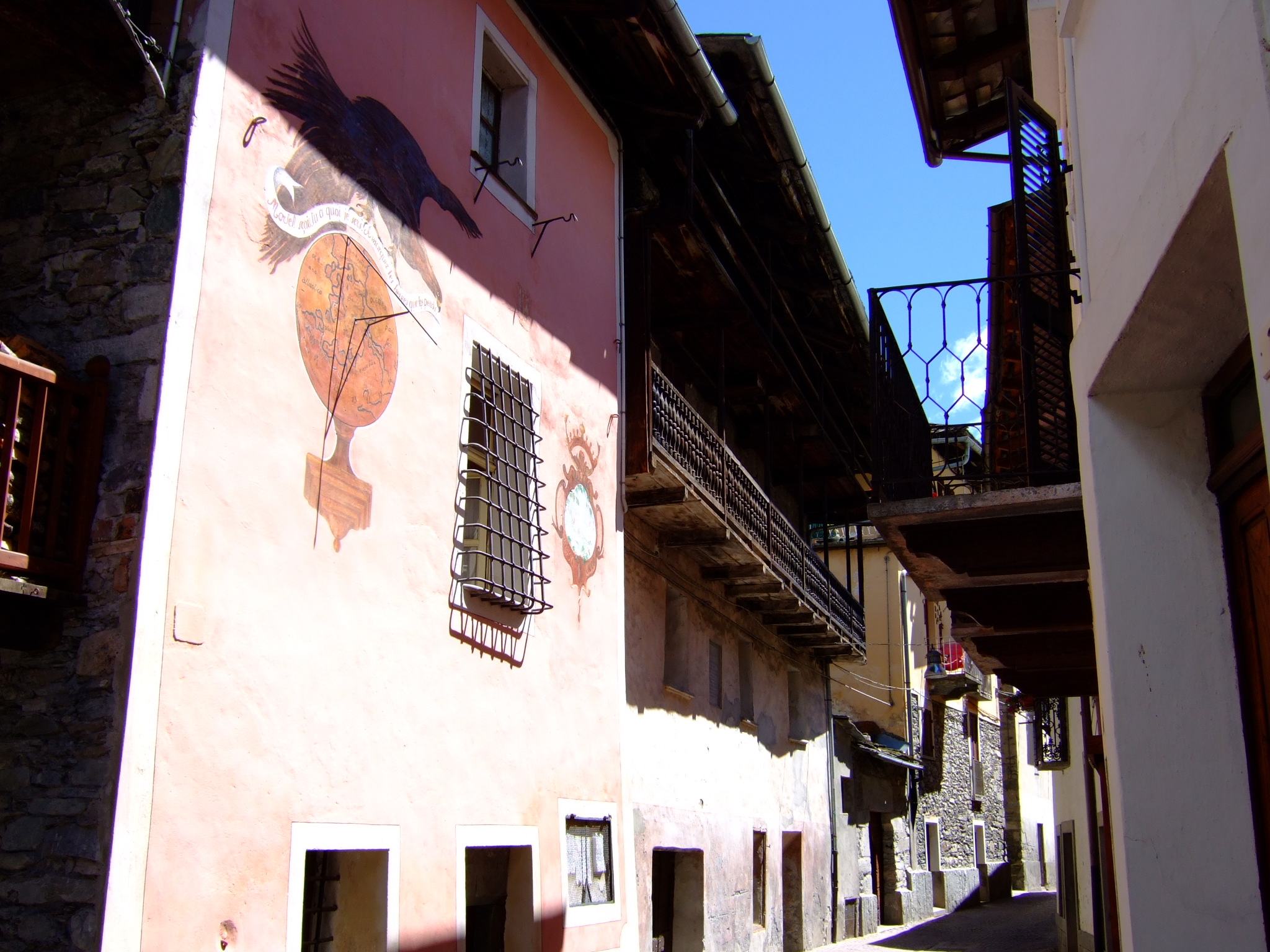

- Location within Italy Location within Piedmont
- Coordinates: 44°35′N 7°4′E
- Country: Italy
- Region: Piedmont
- Province: Cuneo (CN)
- Frazioni: Torrette, Bertines, Serre, Alboin, Pusterle, Rabioux

Government
  - Mayor: Alberto Anello

Area
  - Total: 33.95 km^{2} (13.11 sq mi)
- Elevation: 1,296 m (4,252 ft)

Population (1-1-2017)
  - Total: 158
  - Density: 4.65/km^{2} (12.1/sq mi)
- Demonym: Casteldelfinese(i)
- Time zone: UTC+1 (CET)
  - Summer (DST): UTC+2 (CEST)
- Postal code: 12020
- Dialing code: 0175
- Website: Official website

Casteldelfino is a comune (municipality) in the Province of Cuneo in the Italian region Piedmont, located about 70 kilometres (43 mi) southwest of Turin and about 45 kilometres (28 mi) northwest of Cuneo.

Casteldelfino borders the following municipalities: Bellino, Elva, Oncino, Pontechianale, and Sampeyre. It is located in the upper Varaita Valley.
