= Macra =

- Comune
- Comune di Macra
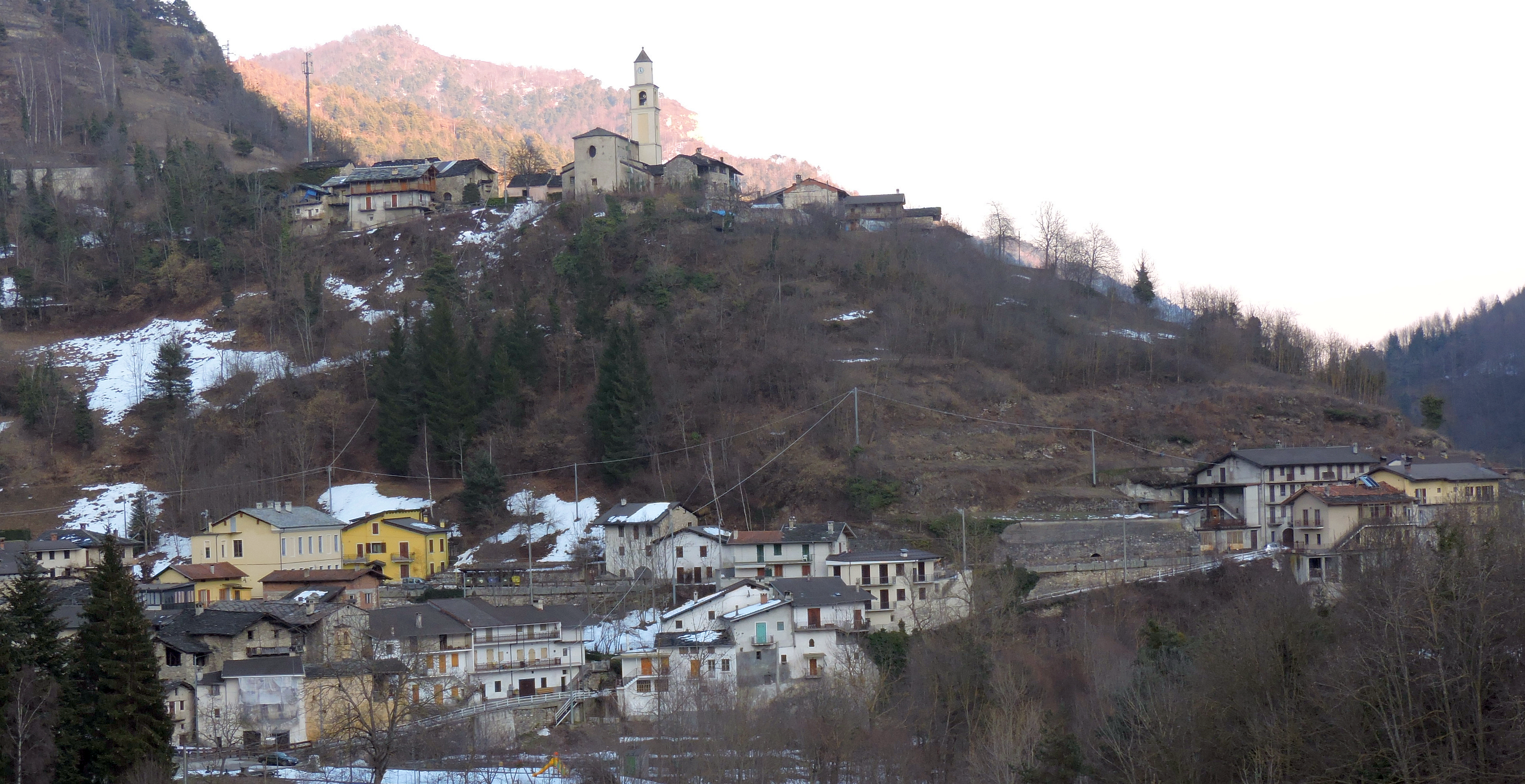
- View of Macra

- Coat of arms

- Location within Italy Location within Piedmont
- Coordinates: 44°29′N 7°9′E
- Country: Italy
- Region: Piedmont
- Province: Cuneo (CN)
- Frazioni: Albaretto, Camoglieres

Government
  - Mayor: Valerio Carsetti

Area
  - Total: 24.66 km^{2} (9.52 sq mi)
- Elevation: 875 m (2,871 ft)

Population (2026)
  - Total: 42
  - Density: 1.7/km^{2} (4.4/sq mi)
- Time zone: UTC+1 (CET)
  - Summer (DST): UTC+2 (CEST)
- Postal code: 12020
- Dialing code: 0171
- Website: Official website

Macra is a village and comune (municipality) in the Province of Cuneo in the region of Piedmont in Italy, located about 80 kilometres (50 mi) southwest of Turin and about 35 kilometres (22 mi) northwest of Cuneo. It has 42 inhabitants.

Macra borders the municipalities of Celle di Macra, Marmora, Sampeyre, San Damiano Macra, and Stroppo.

== Demographics ==
As of 2026, the population is 42, of which 50% are male, and 50% are female. Minors make up 9.5% of the population, and seniors make up 40.5%.

Historical population

Year	Pop.	±%
1861	1,004	—
1871	1,014	+1.0%
1881	1,109	+9.4%
1901	1,048	−5.5%
1911	1,058	+1.0%
1921	992	−6.2%
1931	861	−13.2%
1936	739	−14.2%

Year	Pop.	±%
1951	582	−21.2%
1961	349	−40.0%
1971	155	−55.6%
1981	107	−31.0%
1991	81	−24.3%
2001	61	−24.7%
2011	52	−14.8%
2021	43	−17.3%

Source: ISTAT

=== Immigration ===
As of 2025, of the known countries of birth of 42 residents, the most numerous are: Italy (39 – 92.9%), Germany (2 – 4.8%) and France (1 – 2.4%).
