= Frassino =

- Comune
- Comune di Frassino
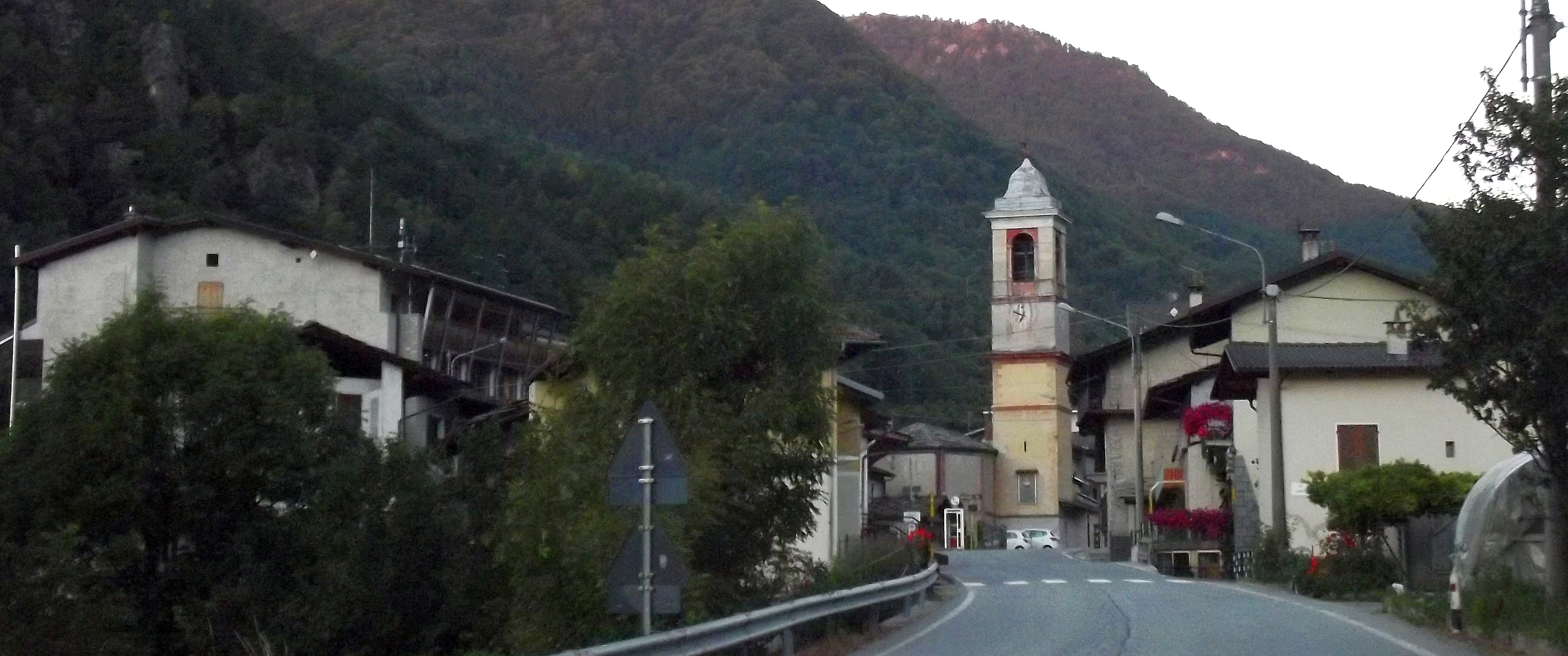

- Coat of arms

- Location within Italy Location within Piedmont
- Coordinates: 44°34′N 7°17′E
- Country: Italy
- Region: Piedmont
- Province: Cuneo (CN)

Government
  - Mayor: Bernardino Matteodo

Area
  - Total: 16.8 km^{2} (6.5 sq mi)
- Elevation: 750 m (2,460 ft)

Population (31 August 2017)
  - Total: 273
  - Density: 16.2/km^{2} (42.1/sq mi)
- Demonym: Frassinesi
- Time zone: UTC+1 (CET)
  - Summer (DST): UTC+2 (CEST)
- Postal code: 12020
- Dialing code: 0175
- Website: Official website

Frassino is a comune (municipality) in the Province of Cuneo in the Italian region Piedmont, located about 60 kilometres (37 mi) southwest of Turin and about 30 kilometres (19 mi) northwest of Cuneo.

Frassino borders the following municipalities: Brossasco, Melle, Sampeyre, and San Damiano Macra.
