= Bellino =

- Comune
- Comune di Bellino
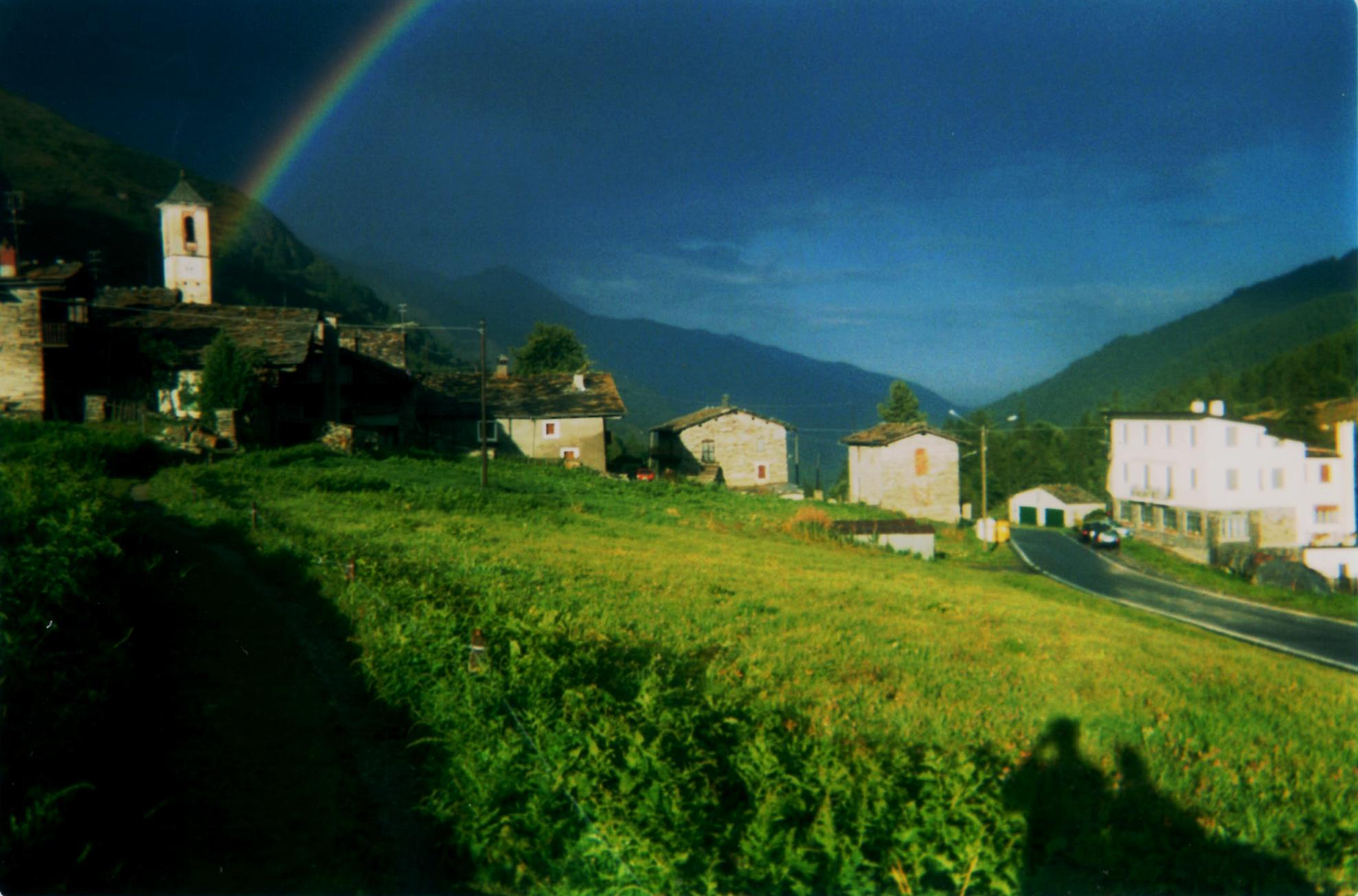
- View of the frazione of Celle.

- Coat of arms

- Location within Italy Location within Piedmont
- Coordinates: 44°35′N 7°2′E
- Country: Italy
- Region: Piedmont
- Province: Cuneo (CN)
- Frazioni: Celle, Chiesa, Prafoucher, Ribiera, Sant'Anna

Government
  - Mayor: Mario Munari

Area
  - Total: 61.7 km^{2} (23.8 sq mi)
- Elevation: 1,576 m (5,171 ft)

Population (30 April 2017)
  - Total: 107
  - Density: 1.73/km^{2} (4.49/sq mi)
- Demonym: Bellinesi
- Time zone: UTC+1 (CET)
  - Summer (DST): UTC+2 (CEST)
- Postal code: 12020
- Dialing code: 0175

Bellino is a comune (municipality) in the Province of Cuneo in the Italian region Piedmont, located about 80 kilometres (50 mi) southwest of Turin and about 45 kilometres (28 mi) northwest of Cuneo, on the border with France. It is located in the upper Varaita Valley.

Bellino borders the following municipalities: Acceglio, Casteldelfino, Elva, Pontechianale, Prazzo, and Saint-Paul-sur-Ubaye (France). The Pelvo d'Elva peak is located in the communal territory.

== See also ==
- Monte Ferra
