= Stroppo =

- Comune
- Comune di Stroppo
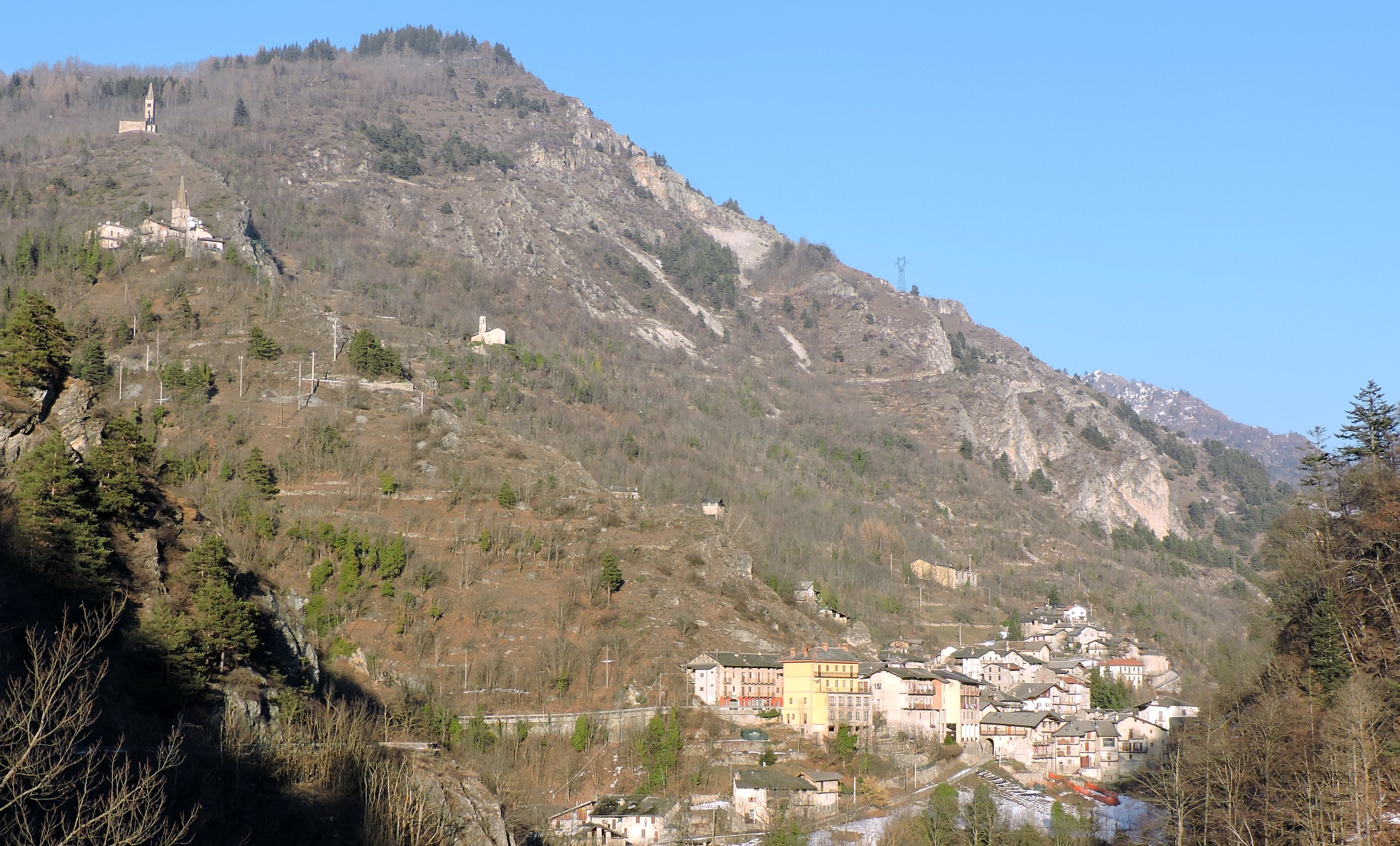

- Location within Italy Location within Piedmont
- Coordinates: 44°30′N 7°8′E
- Country: Italy
- Region: Piedmont
- Province: Cuneo (CN)

Government
  - Mayor: Paolo Rovera

Area
  - Total: 28.4 km^{2} (11.0 sq mi)
- Elevation: 1,087 m (3,566 ft)

Population (31 December 2010)
  - Total: 114
  - Density: 4.01/km^{2} (10.4/sq mi)
- Time zone: UTC+1 (CET)
  - Summer (DST): UTC+2 (CEST)
- Postal code: 12020
- Dialing code: 0171
- Website: Official website

Stroppo is a comune (municipality) in the Province of Cuneo in the Italian region of Piedmont, located about 80 kilometres (50 mi) southwest of Turin and about 35 kilometres (22 mi) northwest of Cuneo.

Stroppo borders the municipalities of Elva, Macra, Marmora, Prazzo and Sampeyre.
