= Sampeyre =

- Comune
- Comune di Sampeyre
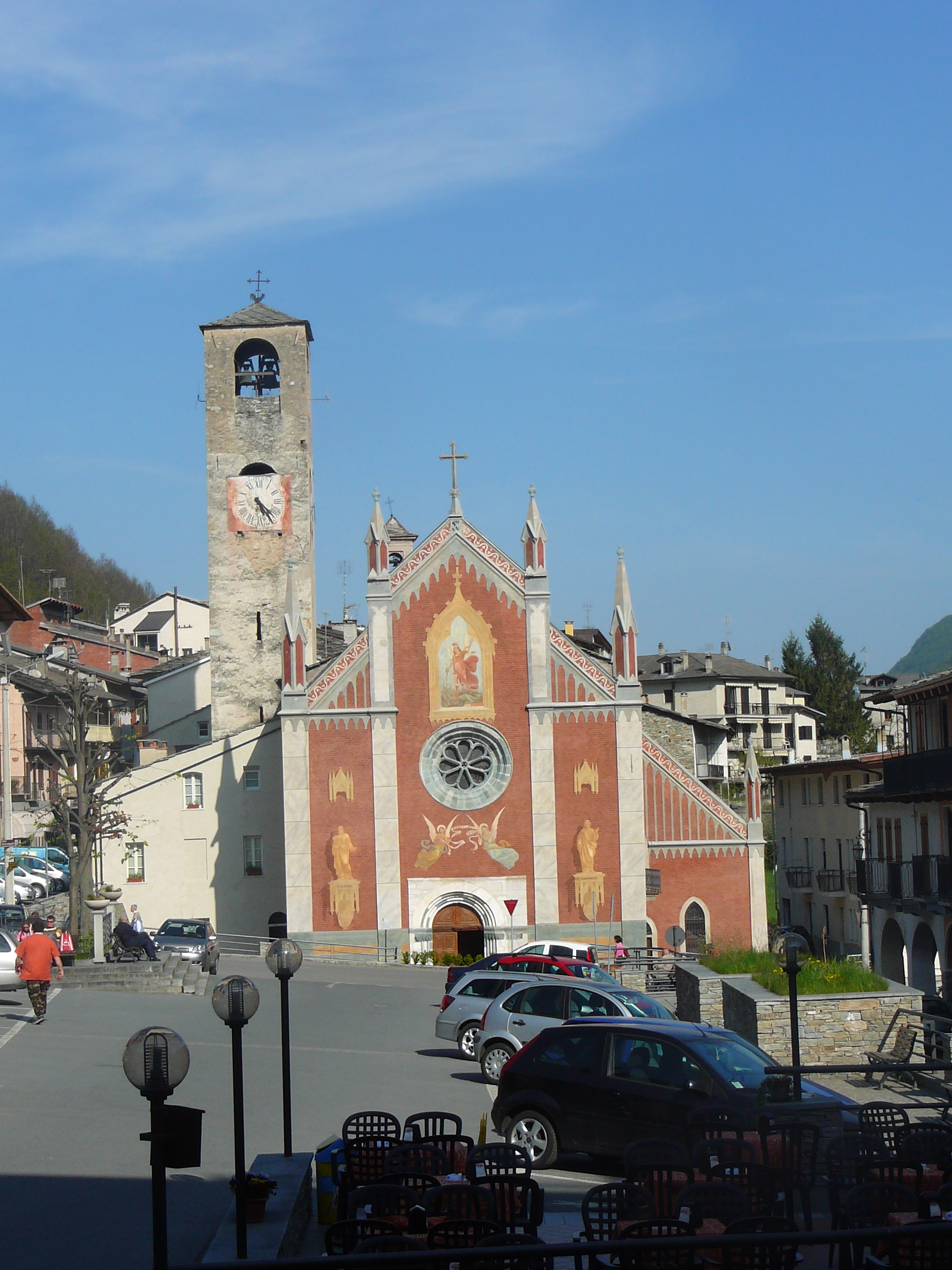

- Location within Italy Location within Piedmont
- Coordinates: 44°35′N 7°11′E
- Country: Italy
- Region: Piedmont
- Province: Cuneo (CN)
- Frazioni: Becetto, Calchesio, Colle di Sampeyre, Dragoniere, Gilba, Rore, Rouera, Sant'Anna, Villar, Villaretto

Government
  - Mayor: Domenico Amorisco

Area
  - Total: 98.6 km^{2} (38.1 sq mi)
- Elevation: 998 m (3,274 ft)

Population (31 December 2010)
  - Total: 1,098
  - Density: 11.1/km^{2} (28.8/sq mi)
- Demonym: Sampeyresi
- Time zone: UTC+1 (CET)
  - Summer (DST): UTC+2 (CEST)
- Postal code: 12020
- Dialing code: 0175
- Website: Official website

Sampeyre is a comune (municipality) in the Province of Cuneo in the Italian region Piedmont, located about 70 kilometres (43 mi) southwest of Turin and about 35 kilometres (22 mi) northwest of Cuneo.

Sampeyre borders the following municipalities: Brossasco, Casteldelfino, Elva, Frassino, Macra, Oncino, Paesana, San Damiano Macra, Sanfront, and Stroppo.

== See also ==
- Baìo
