= Grande Traversée des Alpes =

Coordinates: 45.1148°N 6.6092°E

The Grande Traversée des Alpes (GTA) is a long-distance hiking trail in the French Alps, connecting Thonon-les-Bains on Lake Geneva with Nice. It constitutes the southernmost part of the Sentier de Grande Randonnée GR5.

The GTA was created in the beginning of the 1970s. It was soon imitated in Italy, where another GTA, the Grande Traversata delle Alpi was created. The Via Alpina uses some legs of both the French and the Italian GTA.

The Grande Traversée des Alpes (GTA) is also the name of the association which manages the GTA trail as well as the French part of the Via Alpina and other projects in sustainable, interregional mountain tourism in the French Alps, located in Grenoble.

== Records ==
- Sébastien Raichon holds the speed record for running the GTA in 6 days and 6 hours.
- Louis-Philippe Loncke makes the first unsupported crossing.
