= Rifugio Campo Base =

Alpine refuge in the Province of Cuneo, Italy

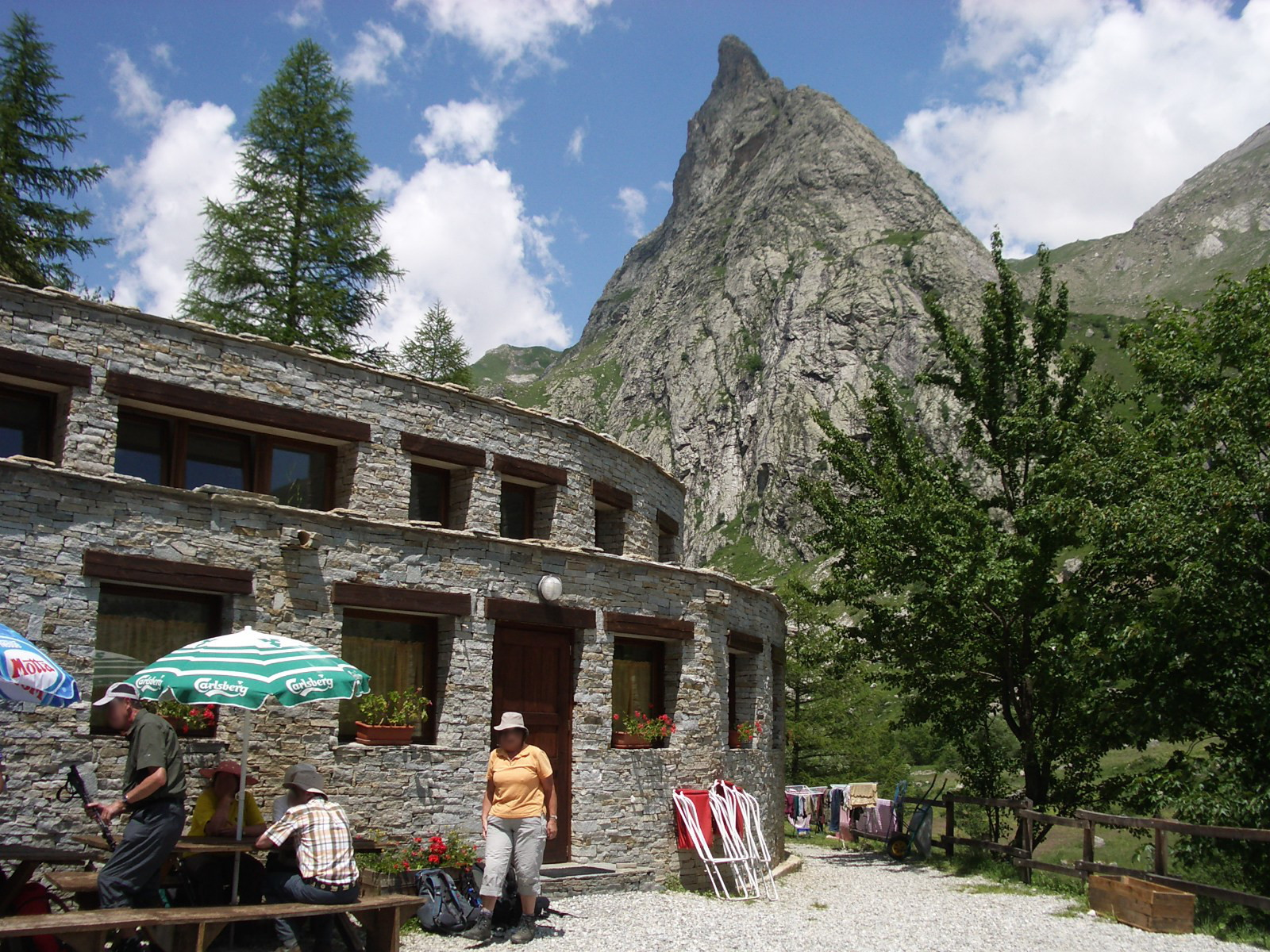
- Rifugio Campo Base and Rocca Provenzale
- Interactive map of the Rifugio Campo Base area

General information
- Coordinates: 44°29′49.43″N 6°55′9.42″E
- Elevation: 1,650 m (5,410 ft)
- Year built: 1982 as mountain hut
- Owner: Comunità montana Valle Maira

The Rifugio Campeggio Campo Base is an alpine refuge located in the Municipality of Acceglio, in the Province of Cuneo, Italy.

== Characteristics ==
It is situated in the frazione of Chiappera, in the upper Maira Valley at approximately 1,650 metres above sea-level on the right bank of the main valley floor of the Maurin river (the upper stretch of the Maira river). Opened in 1982, has been renewed during 2010 and has now 26 sleeping accommodations in the refuge and an area for camping.

It is opened from 20 December to 1 November.

The Rifugio Campo Base is an excellent point of departure and can be a useful base for different itineraries: the GTA (Grande Traversata delle Alpi), the Via Alpina, Percorsi Occitani, Tour of Chambeyron, Sentiero Roberto Cavallero. It is situated at the crossing between the red and the blue trail of the Via Alpina
