= Italian Choral Grand Prix =

Annual choral music competition

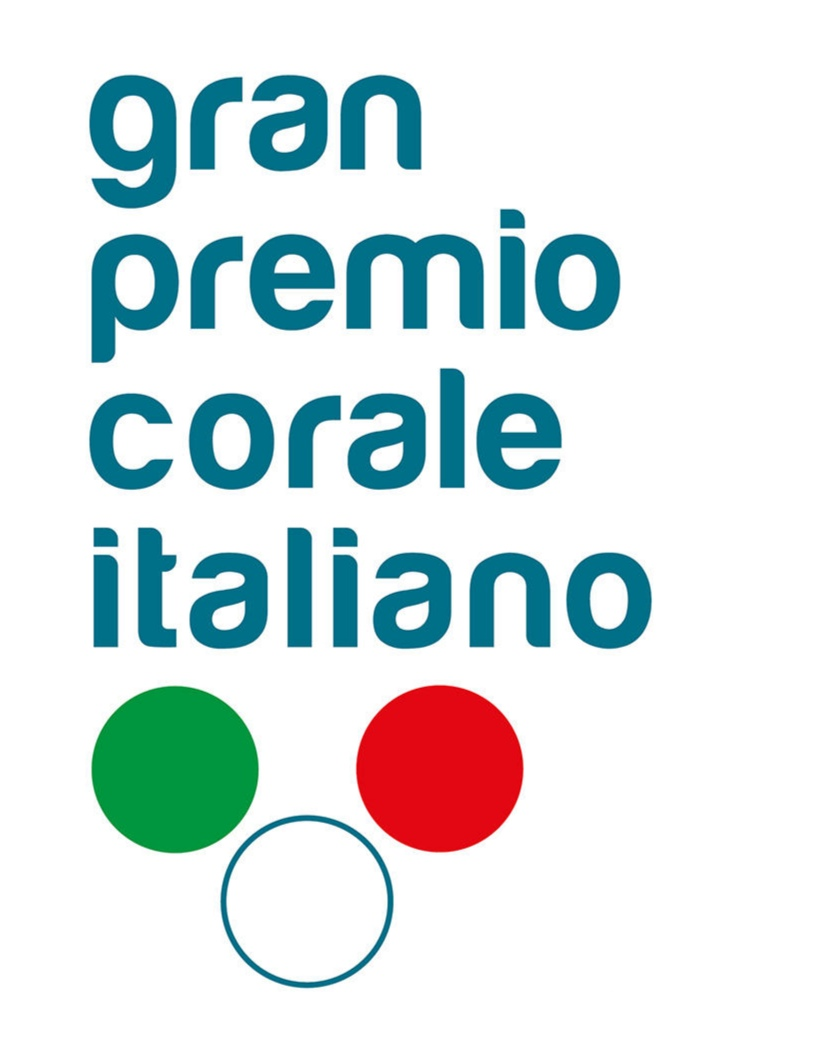
- Genre: Choral music
- Dates: August
- Frequency: Annual
- Venue: Caurum Hall
- Locations: Arezzo, Italy
- Years active: 2024–present
- Founded: 2023
- Organizer: Feniarco, Guido of Arezzo Foundation
- Website: www.feniarco.it/it/cosa-facciamo/gran-premio-corale-italiano

The Italian Choral Grand Prix (Italian: Gran Premio Corale Italiano) is the highest-level choral music competition in Italy. It brings together the winners of choral competitions belonging to the Feniarco network, with the tournament organized by Feniarco in cooperation with the Guido of Arezzo Foundation.

== Format ==
The tournament is contested by the winners of choral competitions belonging to the Feniarco network. These are:

- Vittorio Veneto National Choral Competition (since 2024)
- Lago Maggiore National Choral Competition (since 2024)
- Guido of Arezzo Polyphonic Competition (since 2024)
- Fermo National Choral Competition (since 2024)
- “A. Guanti” National Choral Competition in Matera (since 2024)
- ”L. Pigarelli” National Competition for male choirs (since 2024)
- ”G. Savani” National Choral Competition in Carpi (since 2025)
- ”Cantagiovani” of Salerno (since 2025)
- Riccione Choral Competition (since 2025)

== List of winners ==
Year	Winner
2024	"Coro La Rupe" from Quincinetto
2025	"Nox Ensemble" from Turin
2026	"Coro giovanile With Us" from Rome
