= GR 5 =

Long distance walking trail from the Netherlands to France

GR5
- Length: 2,290 km (1,420 mi)
- Location: Netherlands, Belgium, Luxembourg, Switzerland, France
- Designation: GR footpath, European walking route
- Trailheads: Hook of Holland, Nice
- Use: Hiking

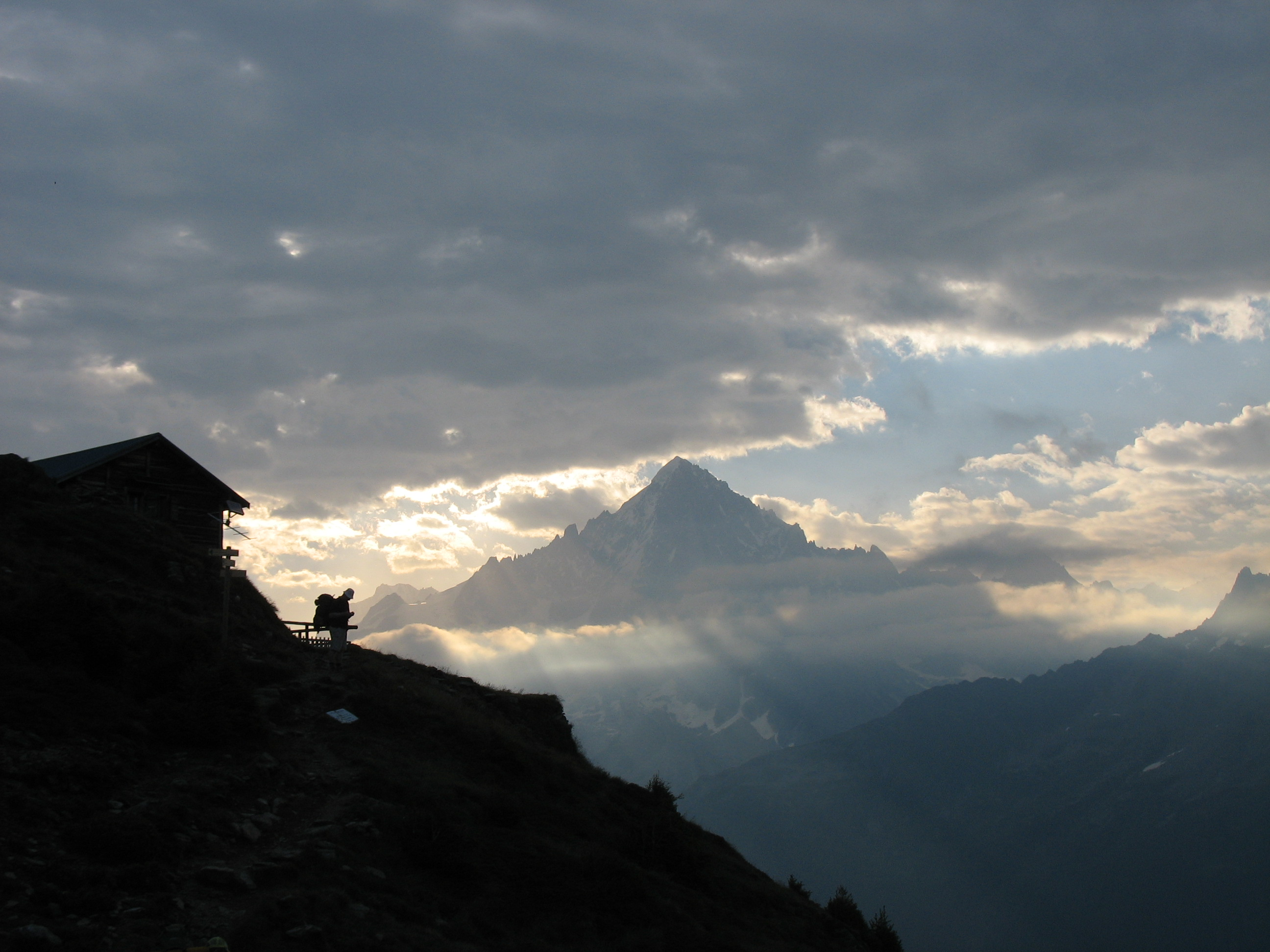
A walker preparing to leave the Refuge de Bel Lachat on the GR5

The GR 5 is a GR footpath that starts in the Netherlands, crosses Belgium and Luxembourg before crossing France from north to south. It is part of the European walking route E2. This trail is famous for its route through the French Alps from Lake Geneva to Nice called Grande Traversée des Alpes.

== Itinerary ==
- Hook of Holland, at the North Sea (NL)
- Bergen op Zoom (NL)
- Hasselt (B)
- Maastricht (NL)
- Liège (B)
- Spa (B)
- Ouren (B)
- Diekirch (L)
- Dudelange, near Luxembourg (L)
- Liverdun, near Nancy (F)
- Donon (F)
- Ballon d'Alsace (F)
- La Cluse, near Pontarlier (F)
- Les Rousses (F)
- Lake Geneva (F) / (CH)
- Samoëns (F)
- Les Houches, near Chamonix (F)
- Modane (F)
- Briançon (F)
- Saint-Étienne de Tinée (F)
- Roure (F)
- Nice (F)
