= Via Alpina =

Network of alpine hiking trails

Coordinates: 46°26′16.28″N 9°42′42.89″E

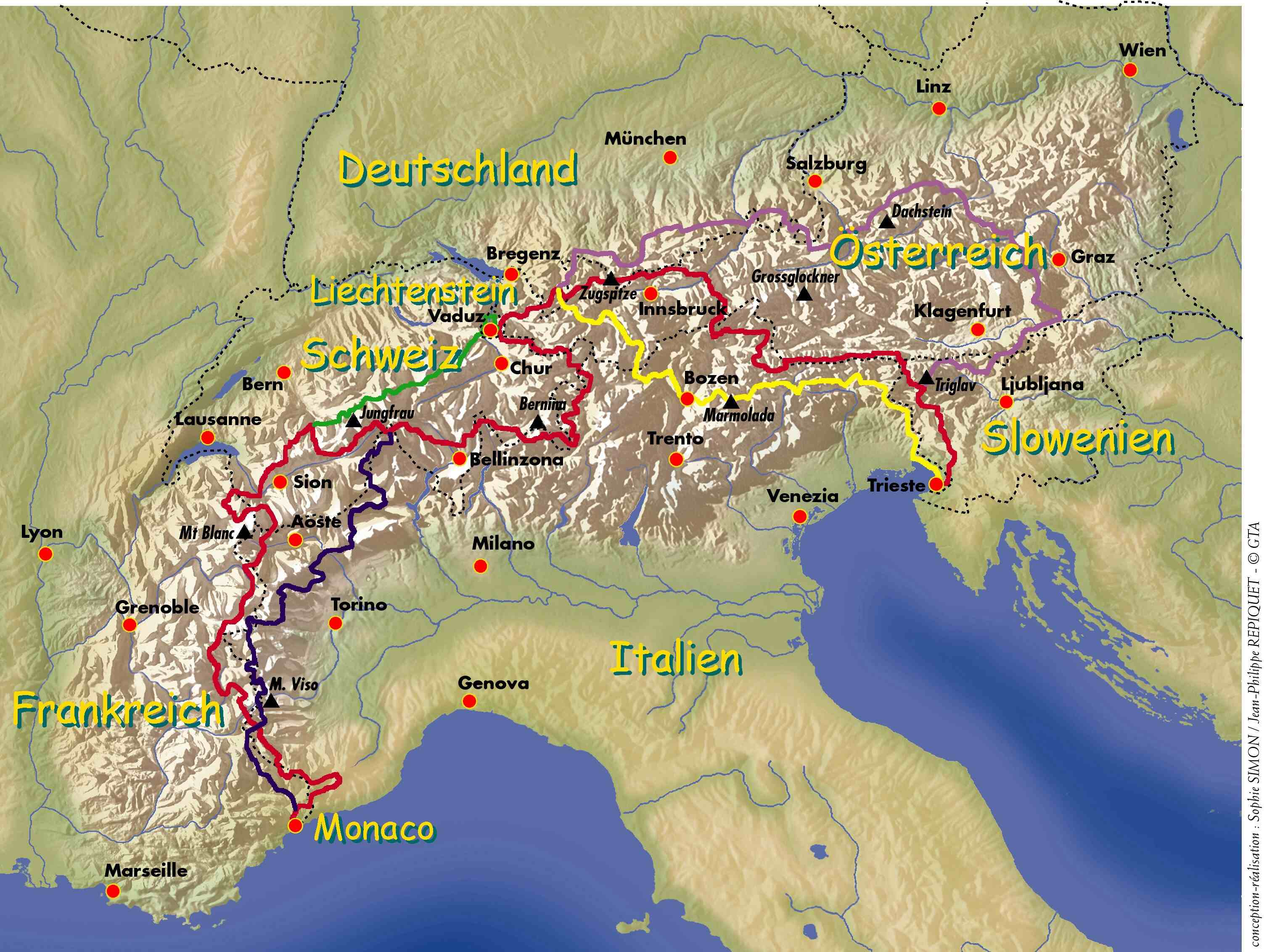
Map of the Via Alpina

The Via Alpina is a network of five long-distance hiking trails across the alpine regions of Slovenia, Austria, Germany, Liechtenstein, Switzerland, Italy, France, and Monaco. The longest of the trails is the Red Trail, whose termini are in Trieste and Monaco.

The Via Alpina was created by a group of public and private organisations from the 8 Alpine countries in 2000, receiving EU funding from 2001 until 2008. It was initiated by the Association Grande Traversée des Alpes in Grenoble, which hosted the Via Alpina international secretariat until January 2014, when it was transferred to the International Commission for the Protection of the Alps CIPRA (Liechtenstein). There are national secretariats (hosted by public administrations or hiking associations) in each country. Its aim is to support sustainable development in remote mountain areas and promote the Alpine cultures and cultural exchanges.

== Purple trail ==
- A1: From Tržaška koča na Doliču to Aljažev dom v Vratih.
- A2: From Aljažev dom v Vratih to Dovje.
- A3: From Dovje to Koča na Golici.
- A4: From Koča na Golici to Prešernova koča na Stolu.
- A5: From Prešernova koča na Stolu to Roblekov Dom.
- A6: From Roblekov Dom to Koča na Dobrči.

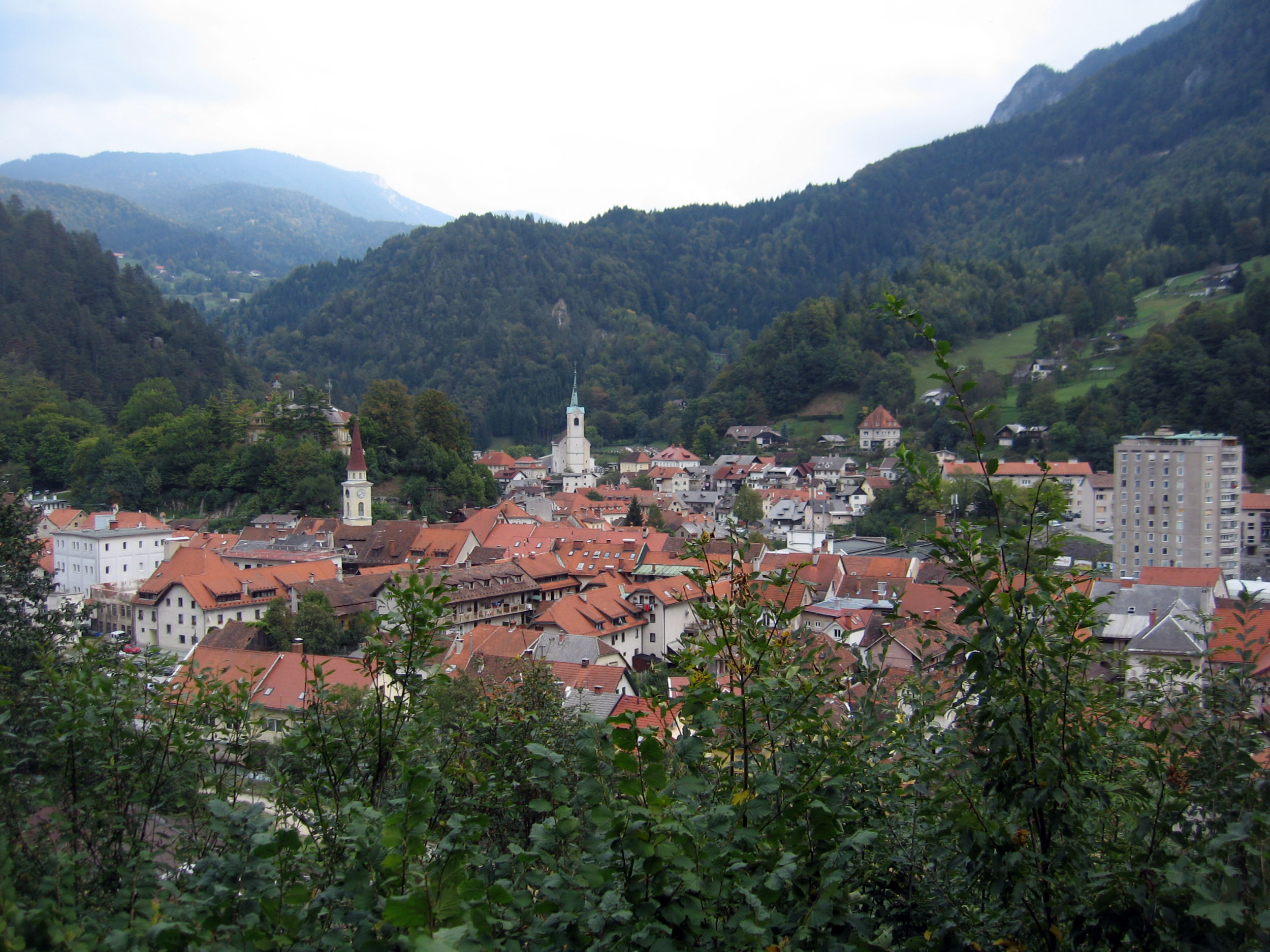
Trzic, Slovenia

- A7: From Koča na Dobrči to Tržič.
- A8: From Tržič to Dom pod Storžičem.
- A9: From Dom pod Storžičem to Zgornje Jezersko.
- A10: From Zgornje Jezersko to Eisenkappler Hut.
- A11: From Eisenkappler Hut to Riepl.
- A12: From Riepl to Bleiburg.
- A13: From Bleiburg to Lavamünd.

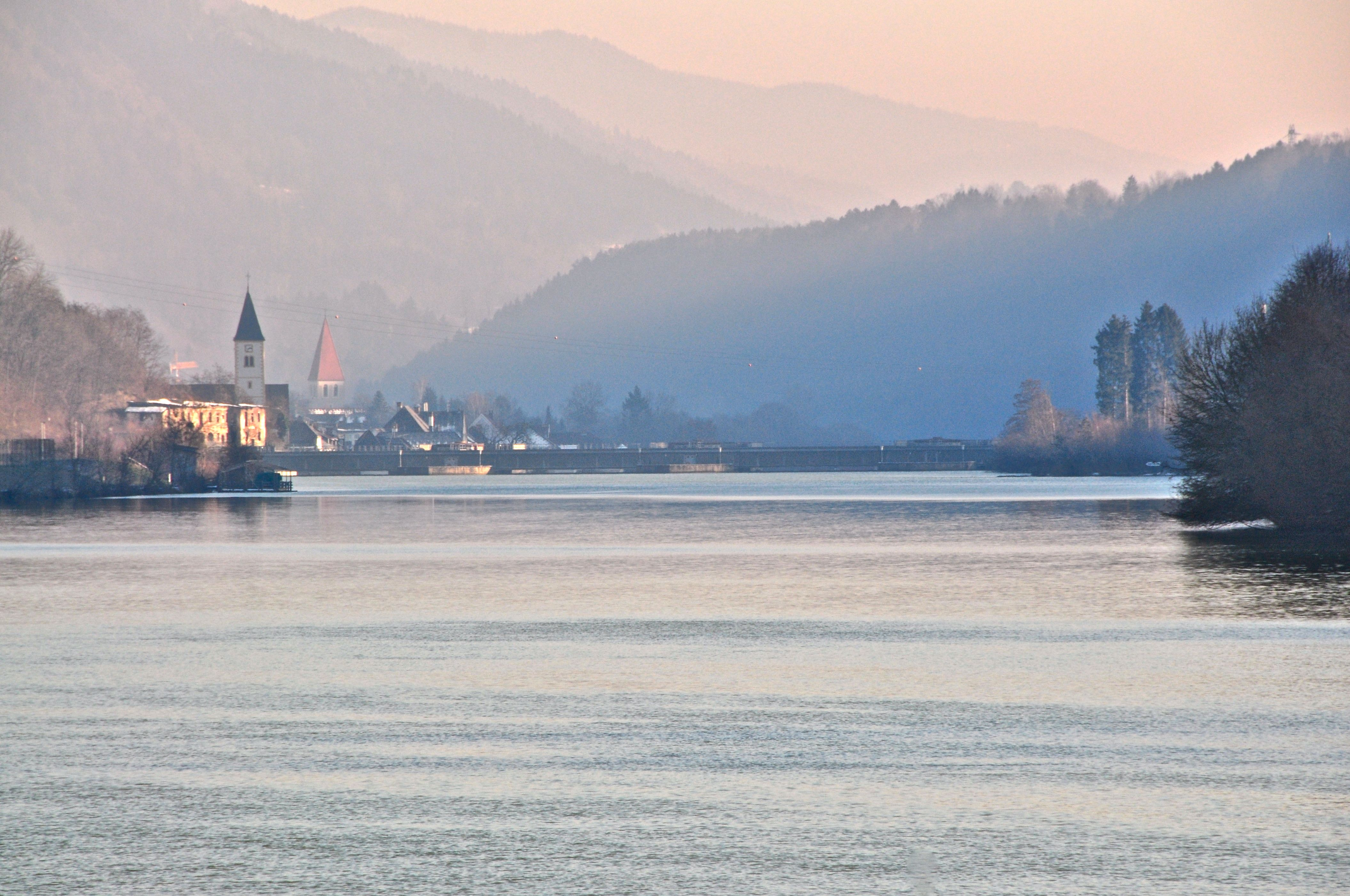
Lavamünd, Austria

- A14: From Lavamünd to Soboth.
- A15: From Soboth to Eibiswald.
- A16: From Eibiswald to Schwanberger-Brendlhütte.
- A17: From Schwanberger-Brendlhütte to Koralpenhaus.
- A18: From Koralpenhaus to Pack.
- A19: From Pack to Salzstiegelhaus.
- A20: From Salzstiegelhaus to Gaberl.
- A21: From Gaberl to Knittelfeld.
- A22: From Knittelfeld to Ingering II.
- A23: From Ingering II to Trieben.
- A24: From Trieben to Admont.
- A25: From Admont to Spital am Pyhrn.
- A26: From Spital am Pyhrn to Zellerhütte.
- A27: From Zellerhütte to Hinterstoder.
- A28: From Hinterstoder to Prielschutzhaus.
- A29: From Prielschutzhaus to Pühringer Hut.
- A30: From Pühringer Hütte to Loserhütte.
- A31: From Loserhütte to Bad Goisern.
- A32: From Bad Goisern to Gosau.
- A33: From Gosau to Theodor-Körner Hut.
- A34: From Theodor-Körner Hut to Lungötz.
- A35: From Lungötz to Werfen.
- A36: From Werfen to Arthur Haus.
- A37: From Arthur Haus to Erichhütte.

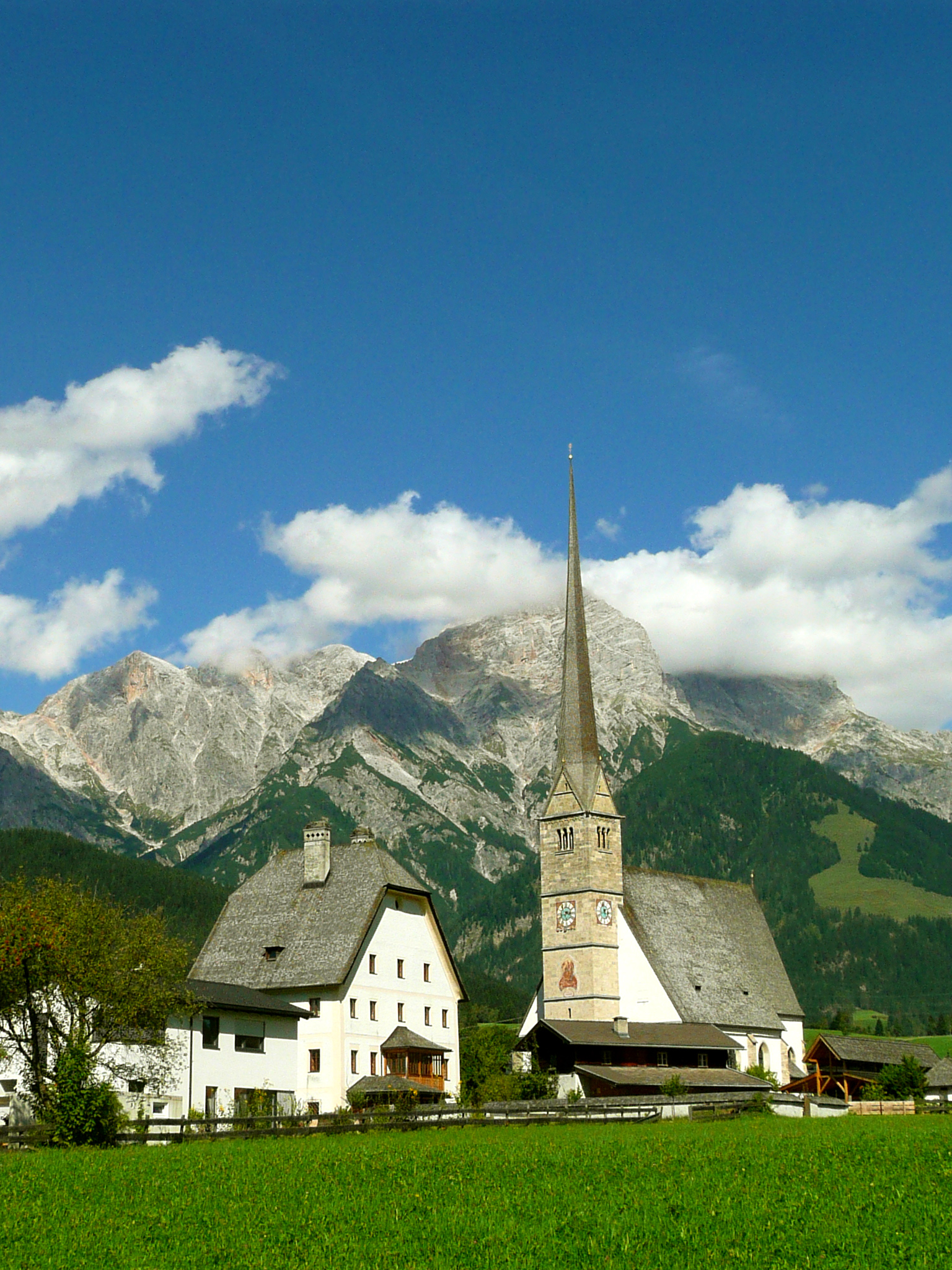
Maria Alm, Austria

- A38: From Erichhütte to Maria Alm.
- A39: From Maria Alm to Riemannhaus.
- A40: From Riemannhaus to Kärlingerhaus.
- A41: From Kärlingerhaus to Königssee.
- A42: From Königssee to Engedey.
- A43: From Engedey to Neue Traunsteiner Hut.
- A44: From Neue Traunsteiner Hütte to Unken.
- A45: From Unken to Ruhpolding.
- A46: From Ruhpolding to Marquartstein.
- A47: From Marquartstein to Kampenwand Bergstation.
- A48: From Kampenwand Bergstation to Priener Hut.
- A49: From Priener Hut to Spitzsteinhaus.
- A50: From Spitzsteinhaus to Oberaudorf.
- A51: From Oberaudorf to Brünnsteinhaus.
- A52: From Brünnsteinhaus to Rotwandhaus.
- A53: From Rotwandhaus to Sutten.
- A54: From Sutten to Kreuth.
- A55: From Kreuth to Lenggries.
- A56: From Lenggries to Tutzinger Hut.

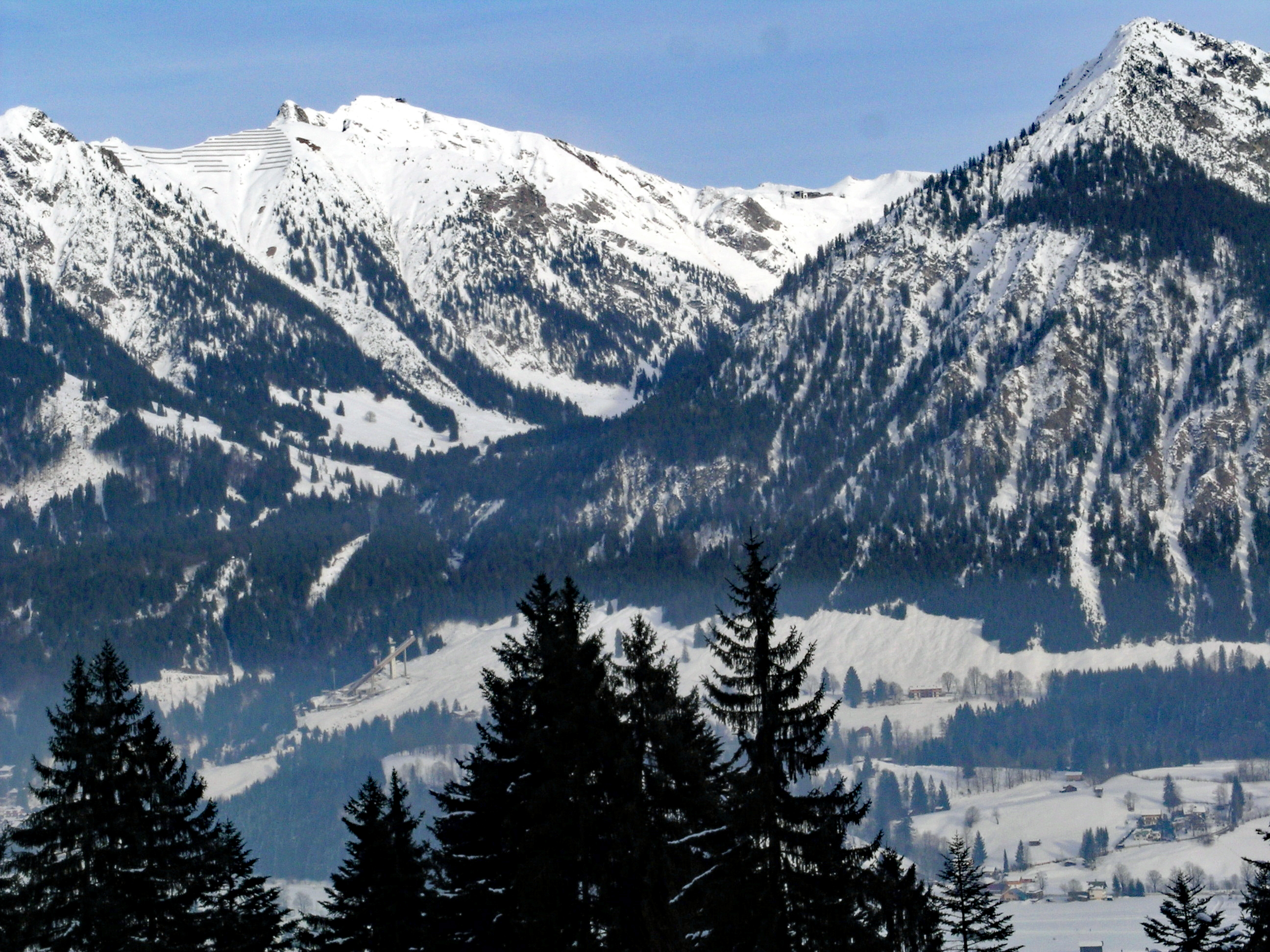
Oberstdorf, Bavarian Alps, Germany

- A57: From Tutzinger Hut to Herzogstand.
- A58: From Herzogstand to Weilheimer Hut.
- A59: From Weilheimer Hut to Garmisch-Partenkirchen.
- A60: From Garmisch-Partenkirchen to Linderhof.
- A61: From Linderhof to Kenzenhütte.
- A62: From Kenzenhütte to Füssen.
- A63: From Füssen to Pfronten.
- A64: From Pfronten to Tannheim.
- A65: From Tannheim to Prinz-Luitpold-Haus.
- A66: From Prinz-Luitpold-Haus to Oberstdorf.

== Yellow Trail ==
- B1: From Muggia (Trieste) to Rifugio Premuda.
- B2: From Rifugio Premuda to Villa Opicina (Sella di Opicina) / Opčine.
- B3: From Villa Opicina (Sella di Opicina) / Opčine to Sistiana / Sesljan.

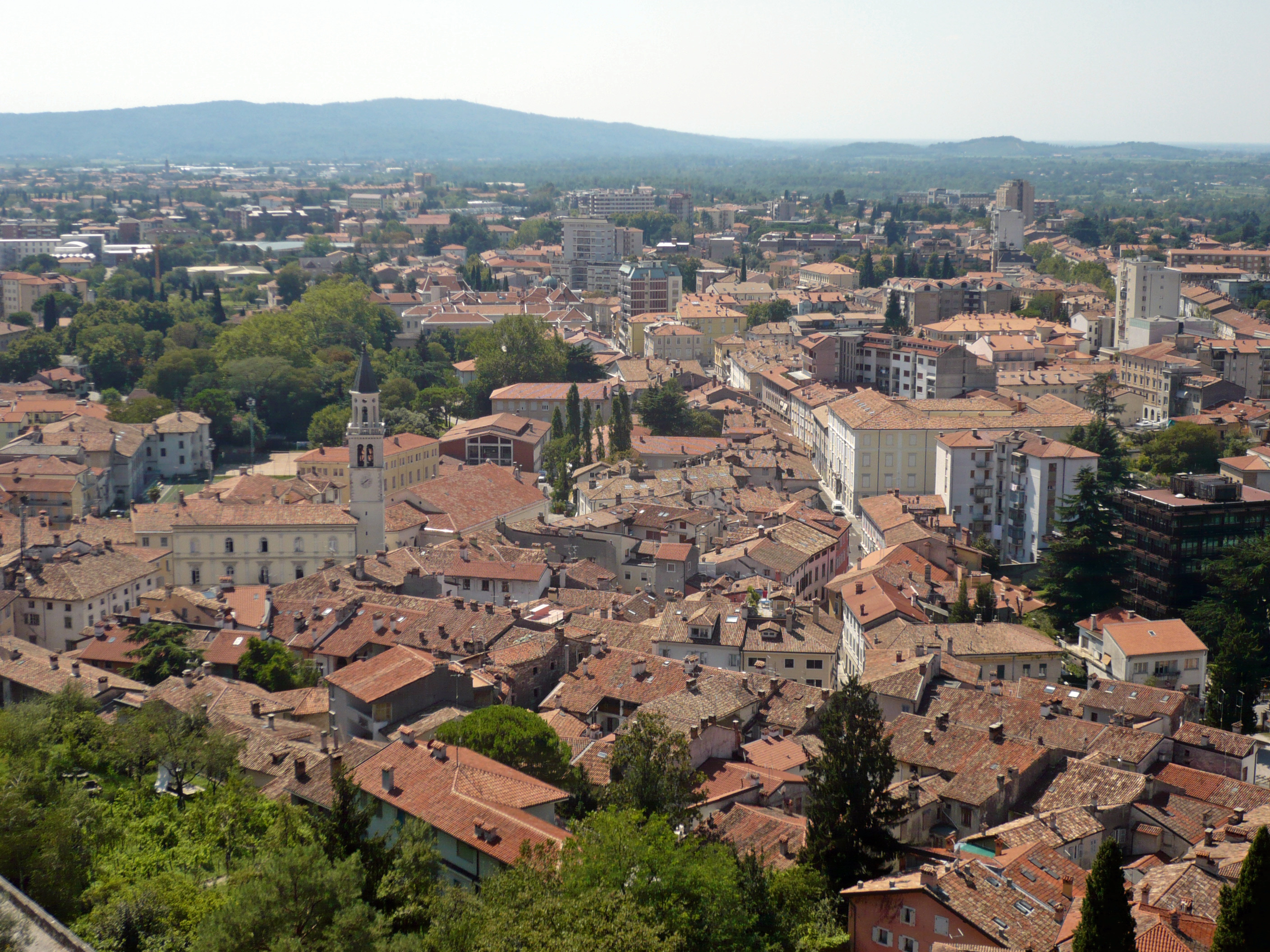
Gorizia, N.E. Italy

- B4: From Sistiana / Sesljan to Gorizia.
- B5: From Gorizia to Castelmonte / Stara Gora.
- B6: From Castelmonte / Stara Gora to Rif. Casoni Solarie.
- B7: From Rif. Casoni Solarie to Rif. G. Pelizzo.
- B8: From Rif. G. Pelizzo to Montemaggiore.
- B9: From Montemaggiore to Passo di Tanamea.
- B10: From Passo di Tanamea to Resiutta.
- B11: From Resiutta to Rifugio Grauzaria.
- B12: From Rifugio Grauzaria to Tolmezzo.

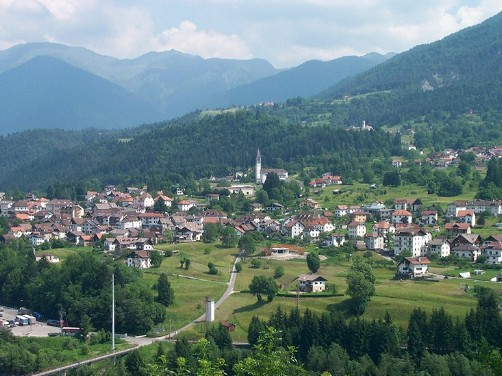
Ovaro (Davar), Italy

- B13: From Tolmezzo to Ovaro.
- B14: From Ovaro to Sauris di Sotto.
- B15: From Sauris di Sotto to Forni di Sopra.
- B16: From Forni di Sopra to Rifugio Pordenone.
- B17: From Rifugio Pordenone to Rifugio Padova.
- B18: From Rifugio Padova to Rifugio P. Galassi.
- B19: From Rifugio P. Galassi to Rif. Città di Fiume.
- B20: From Rif. Città di Fiume to Pieve di Livinallongo.
- B21: From Pieve di Livinallongo to Passo Pordoi.
- B22: From Passo Pordoi to Rifugio Contrin.
- B23: From Rifugio Contrin to Fontanazzo.
- B24: From Fontanazzo to Rifugio Antermoia.
- B25: From Rifugio Antermoia to Schlernhaus / Rifugio Bolzano.
- B26: From Schlernhaus / Rifugio Bolzano to Bozen / Bolzano.
- B27: From Bozen / Bolzano to Meraner Hut / Rifugio Merano.
- B28: From Meraner Hut / Rifugio Merano to Hochganghaus / Rifugio del Valico.
- B29: From Hochganghaus / Rifugio del Valico to Jausenstation Patleid.
- B30: From Jausenstation Patleid to Karthaus / Certosa.

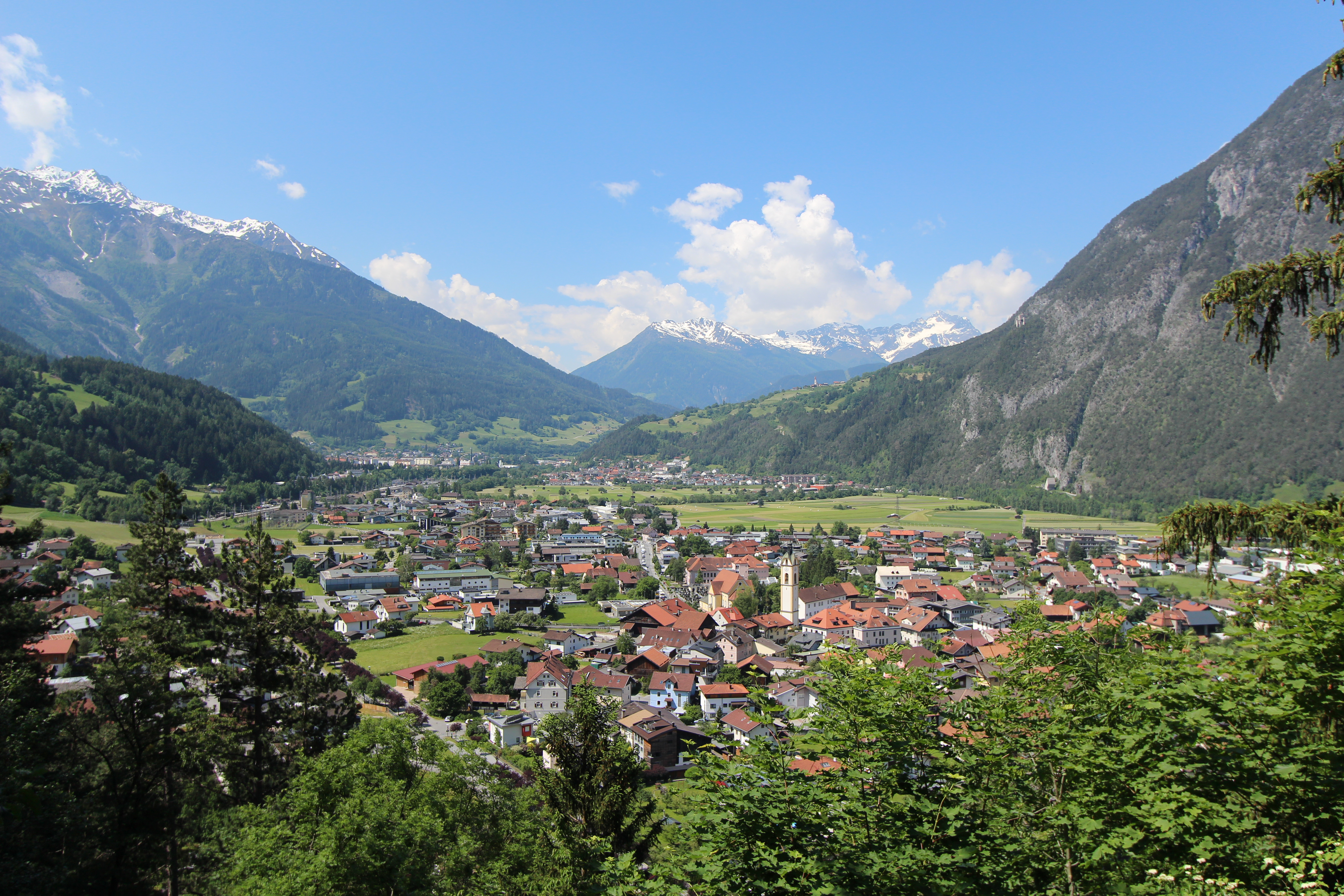
Zams am Inn, Austrian Tyrol

- B31: From Karthaus / Certosa to Similaunhütte / Rifugio Similaun.
- B32: From Similaunhütte / Rifugio Similaun to Vent, Austria.
- B33: From Vent to Zwieselstein.
- B34: From Zwieselstein to Braunschweiger Hut.
- B35: From Braunschweiger Hut to Wenns.
- B36: From Wenns to Zams am Inn.
- B37: From Zams am Inn to Memminger Hut.
- B38: From Memminger Hut to Holzgau.
- B39: From Holzgau to Kemptner Hut.
- B40: From Kemptner Hut to Oberstdorf.

== Green Trail ==
- C1: From Sücka to Vaduz.
- C2: From Vaduz to Sargans.
- C3: From Sargans to Elm.
- C4: From Elm to Linthal.

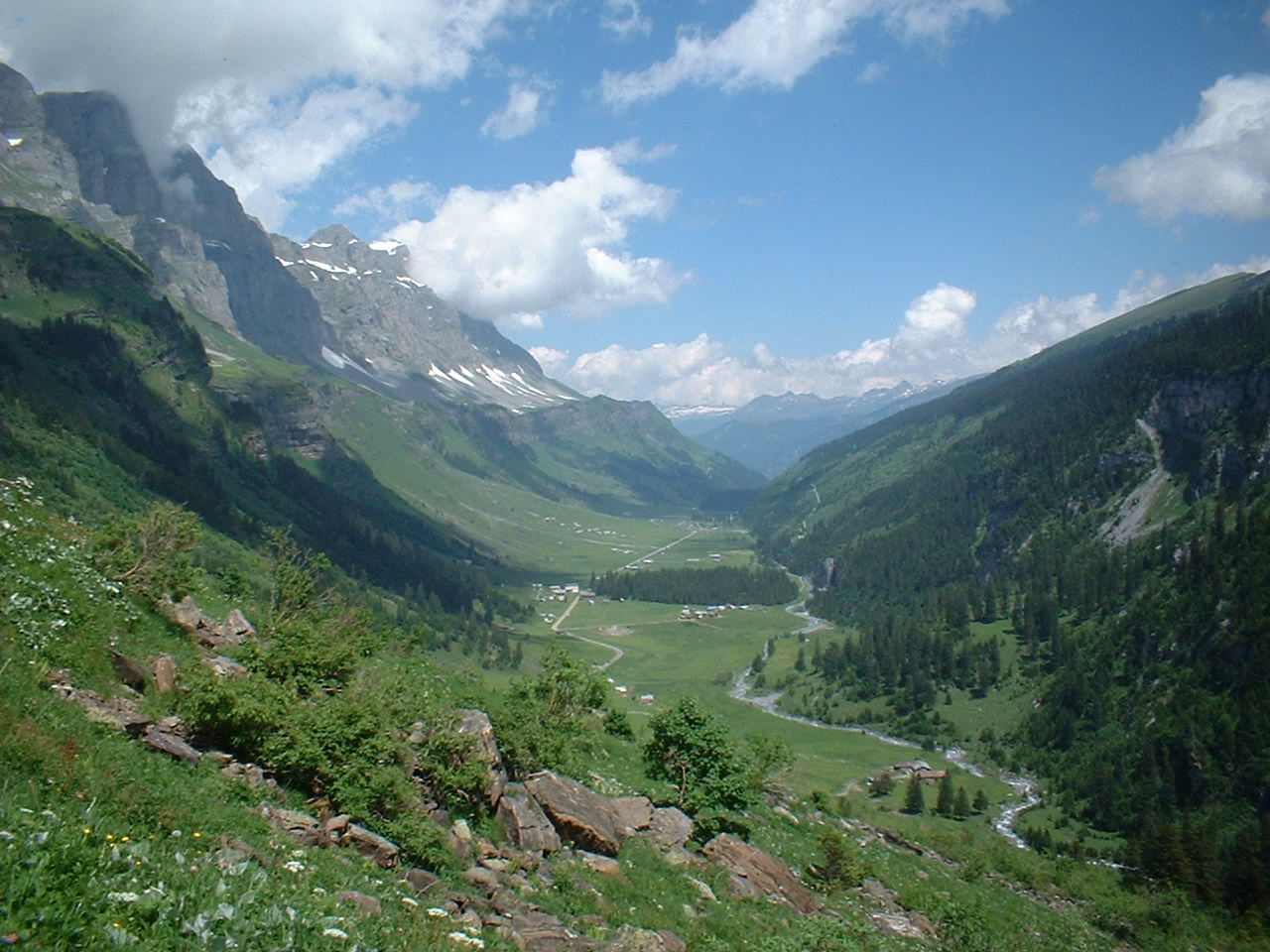
Urnerboden. Switzerland

- C5: From Linthal to Urnerboden.
- C6: From Urnerboden to Altdorf.
- C7: From Altdorf to Engelberg.
- C8: From Engelberg to Meiringen.
- C9: From Meiringen to Grindelwald.
- C10: From Grindelwald to Lauterbrunnen.
- C11: From Lauterbrunnen to Griesalp.
- C12: From Griesalp to Kandersteg.
- C13: From Kandersteg to Adelboden.
- C14: From Adelboden to Lenk.

The Via Alpina green trail follows the Swiss National Route no. 1 (previously known as the Swiss Alpine Pass Route) from Sargans to Lenk, which then continues over a further four passes to Montreux.

== Blue Trail ==
From D11 to D51, coinciding to a large extent with the Piedmontese Grande Traversata delle Alpi (GTA).

- D1: From Riale to Alpe Vannino.
- D2: From Alpe Vannino to Alpe Devero.
- D3: From Alpe Devero to Binn.
- D4: From Binn to Rosswald.

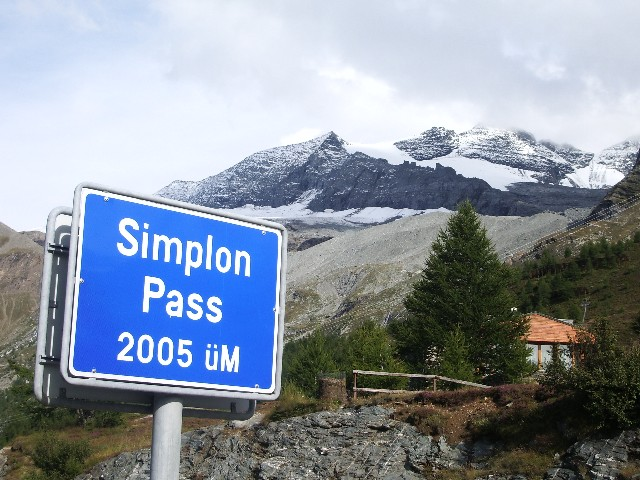
Simplon Pass, Switzerland

- D5: From Rosswald to Simplonpass.
- D6: From Simplonpass to Zwischbergen.
- D7: From Zwischbergen to Alpe il Laghetto.
- D8: From Alpe il Laghetto to Rifugio Andolla.
- D9: From Rifugio Andolla to Antronapiana.
- D10: From Antronapiana to Madonna della Gurva (Molini di Calasca).
- D11: From Madonna della Gurva (Molini di Calasca) to Campello Monti.
- D12: From Campello Monti to Santa Maria di Fobello.
- D13: From Santa Maria di Fobello to Carcoforo.
- D14: From Carcoforo to Rifugio Ferioli.
- D15: From Rifugio Ferioli to S. Antonio di Valvogna.
- D16: From S. Antonio di Valvogna to Gressoney-Saint-Jean.

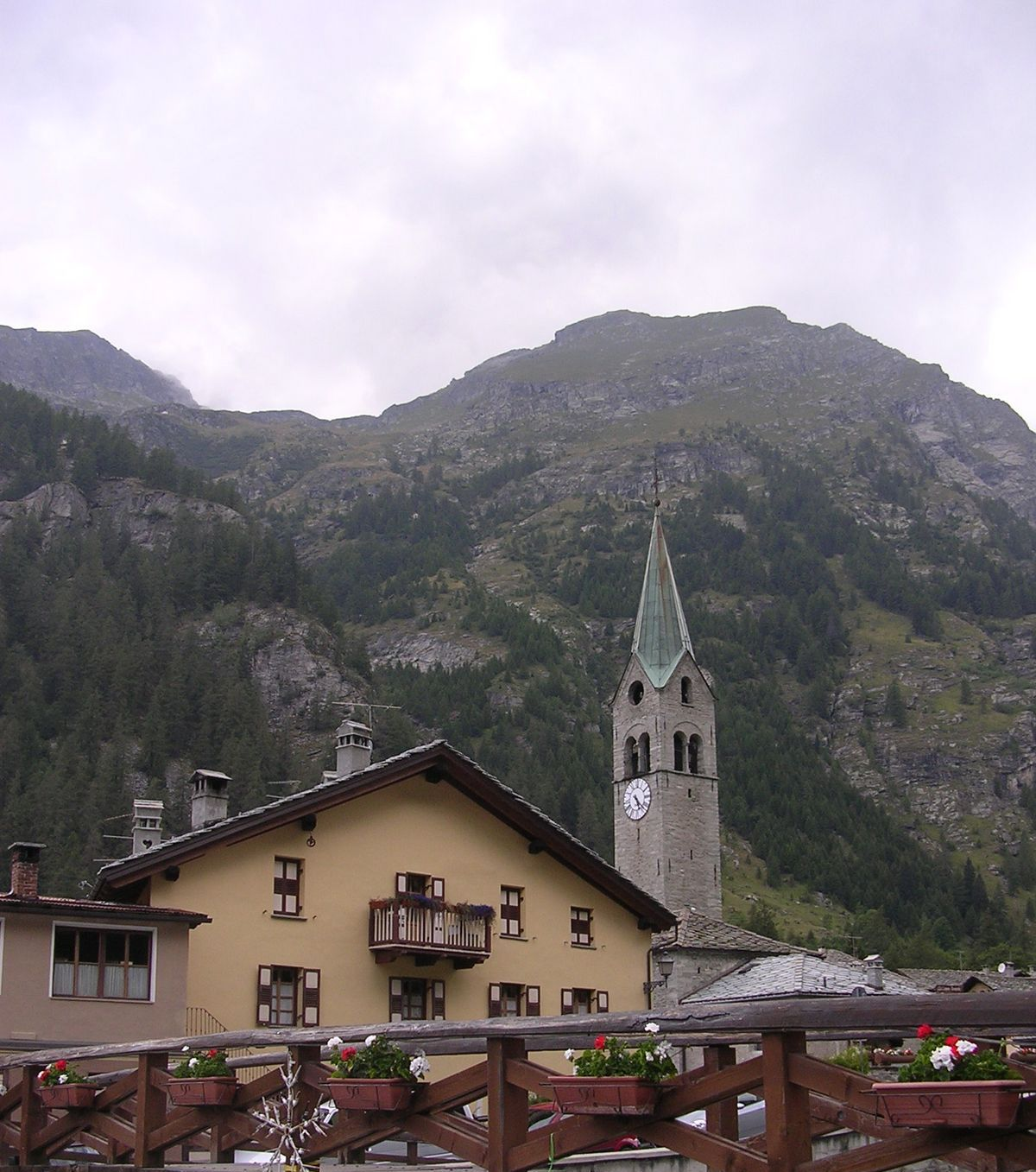
Gressoney-St-Jean, N.W. Italy

- D17: From Gressoney-Saint-Jean to Piedicavallo.
- D18: From Piedicavallo to Issime.
- D19: From Issime to Challand-Saint-Victor.
- D20: From Challand-Saint-Victor to Covarey.
- D21: From Covarey to Rifugio Dondena.
- D22: From Rifugio Dondena to Alpe Péradza.
- D23: From Alpe Péradza to Piamprato.
- D24: From Piamprato to Tallorno.
- D25: From Tallorno to Ronco Canavese.
- D26: From Ronco Canavese to Talosio.
- D27: From Talosio to San Lorenzo.
- D28: From San Lorenzo to Ceresole Reale.
- D29: From Ceresole Reale to Pialpetta.
- D30: From Pialpetta to Balme.
- D31: From Balme to Usseglio.
- D32: From Usseglio to Rifugio Riposa.
- D33: From Rifugio Riposa to Rifugio Stellina.
- D34: From Rifugio Stellina to Refuge du Petit Mont Cenis.
- D35: From Refuge du Petit Mont Cenis to Rifugio Vaccarone.
- D36: From Rifugio Vaccarone to Rifugio Levi-Molinari.
- D37: From Rifugio Levi-Molinari to Rifugio D. Arlaud.
- D38: From Rifugio D. Arlaud to Usseaux.
- D39: From Usseaux to Balsiglia.
- D40: From Balsiglia to Ghigo di Prali.
- D41: From Ghigo di Prali to Rifugio Lago Verde.
- D42: From Rifugio Lago Verde to Le Roux.
- D43: From Le Roux to Rifugio W. Jervis.
- D44: From Rifugio W. Jervis to Rifugio Barbara Lowrie.
- D45: From Rifugio Barbara Lowrie to Pian del Re.
- D46: From Pian del Re to Refuge du Viso.
- D47: From Refuge du Viso to Rifugio Savigliano.
- D48: From Rifugio Savigliano to Chiesa di Bellino.
- D49: From Chiesa di Bellino to Serre di Val d'Elva.
- D50: From Serre di Val d'Elva to Ussolo.
- D51: From Ussolo to Chiappera.

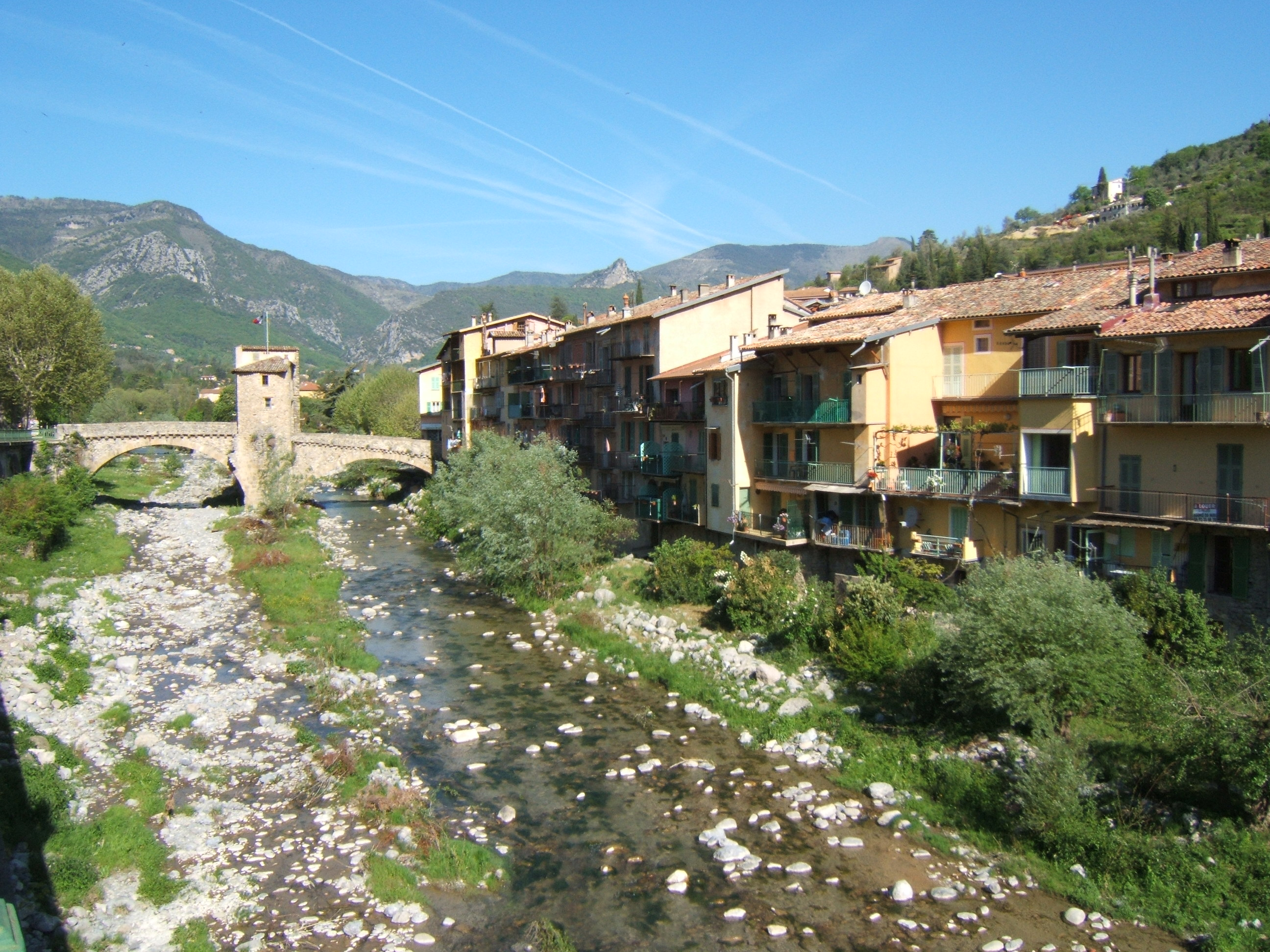
Sospel, Maritime Alps, S.E. France

- D52: From Chiappera to Larche.
- D53: From Larche to Bousiéyas.
- D54: From Bousiéyas to St-Etienne-de-Tinée.
- D55: From St-Etienne-de-Tinée to Roya.
- D56: From Roya to Refuge de Longon.
- D57: From Refuge de Longon to St Sauveur-sur-Tinée.
- D58: From St Sauveur-sur-Tinée to St-Martin-Vésubie.
- D59: From St-Martin-Vésubie to Belvédère.
- D60: From Belvédère to Col de Turini.
- D61: From Col de Turini to Sospel.

== Red Trail ==
The longest trail, crossing all 8 countries.

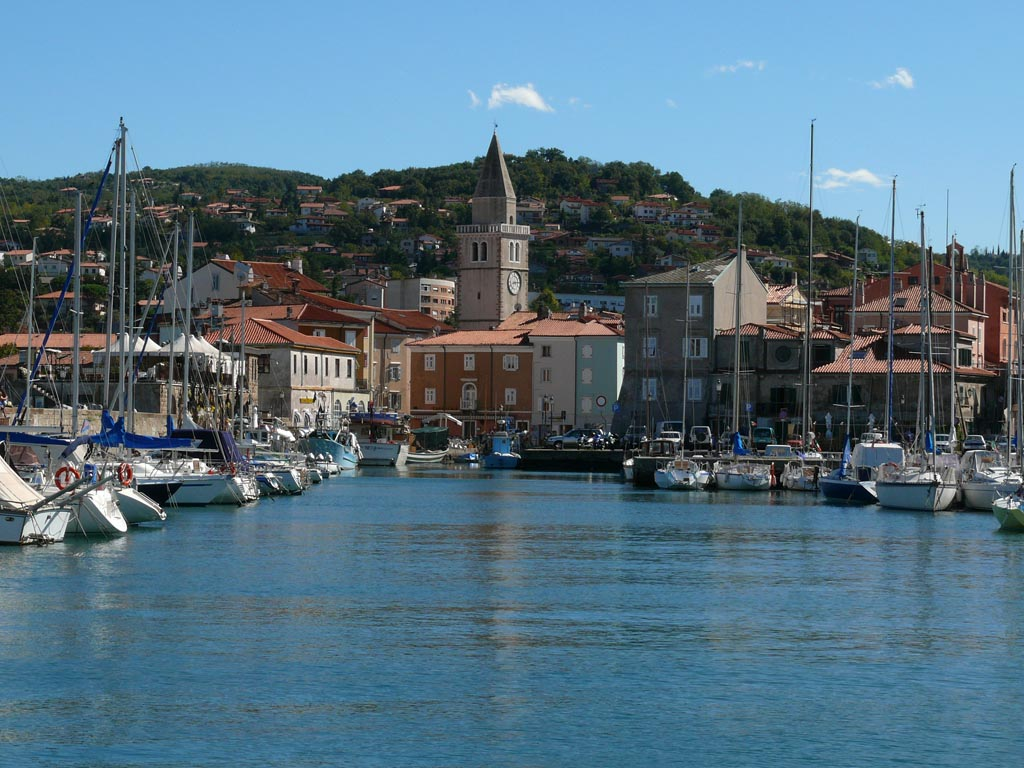
Muggia, Trieste, Italy

- R1: From Muggia (Trieste) to Rifugio Premuda.
- R2: From Rifugio Premuda to Matavun (Divača).
- R3: From Matavun (Divača) to Razdrto.
- R4: From Razdrto to Predjama.
- R5: From Predjama to Črni vrh.
- R6: From Črni vrh to Idrija.
- R7: From Idrija to Planinska koča na Ermanovcu.
- R8: From Planinska koča na Ermanovcu to Porezen.
- R9: From Porezen to Črna Prst.
- R10: From Črna Prst to Dom na Komni.
- R11: From Dom na Komni to Koča pri Triglavskih jezerih.
- R12: From Koča pri Triglavskih jezerih to Tržaška koča na Doliču.
- R13: From Tržaška koča na Doliču to the Trenta Valley.
- R14: From Trenta to Dom v Tamarju.
- R15: From Dom v Tamarju to Thörl-Maglern.
- R16: From Thörl-Maglern to Feistritzer Alm.
- R17: From Feistritzer Alm to Egger Alm.
- R18: From Egger Alm to Naßfeld.
- R19: From Naßfeld to Zollnersee Hut ehm. Dr. Steinwender Hut.
- R20: From Zollnersee Hut ehm. Dr. Steinwender Hut to Untere Valentinalm.
- R21: From Untere Valentinalm to Wolayersee Hut.
- R22: From Wolayersee Hut to Hochweißsteinhaus.
- R23: From Hochweißsteinhaus to Neue Porze Hut.
- R24: From Neue Porze Hut to Obstansersee Hut.
- R25: From Obstansersee Hut to Sillianer Hut.
- R26: From Sillianer Hut to Drei-Zinnen Hut / Rifugio Locatelli.
- R27: From Drei-Zinnen Hut / Rifugio Locatelli to Dürrensteinhütte / Rifugio Vallandro.
- R28: From Dürrensteinhütte / Rifugio Vallandro to Seekofelhütte / Rifugio Biella.
- R29: From Seekofelhütte / Rifugio Biella to St. Martin in Gsies / S. Martino in Casies.
- R30: From St. Martin in Gsies / S. Martino in Casies to Antholz-Mittertal / Anterselva di Mezzo.
- R31: From Antholz-Mittertal / Anterselva di Mezzo to Rieserfernerhütte / Rifugio Vedrette di Ries.
- R32: From Rieserfernerhütte / Rifugio Vedrette di Ries to Ahornach / Acereto.
- R33: From Ahornach / Acereto to Chemnitzer Hut / Rifugio G. Porro.
- R34: From Chemnitzer Hut / Rifugio G. Porro to Dun (Pfunders / Fundres).
- R35: From Dun (Pfunders / Fundres) to Pfitscherjoch / Passo Vizze.
- R36: From Pfitscherjoch / Passo Vizze to Ginzling.
- R37: From Ginzling to Finkenberg.
- R38: From Finkenberg to Rastkogelhütte.
- R39: From Rastkogelhütte to Loassattel.
- R40: From Loassattel to Schwaz.
- R41: From Schwaz to Lamsenjochhütte.
- R42: From Lamsenjochhütte to Falkenhütte.
- R43: From Falkenhütte to Scharnitz.
- R44: From Scharnitz to Meilerhütte.
- R45: From Meilerhütte to Reintalanger Hut.
- R46: From Reintalanger Hut to Coburger Hut.
- R47: From Coburger Hut to Wolfratshauser Hütte.
- R48: From Wolfratshauser Hut to Weißenbach am Lech.
- R49: From Weißenbach am Lech to Prinz-Luitpold-Haus.
- R50: From Prinz-Luitpold-Haus to Oberstdorf.
- R51: From Oberstdorf to Mindelheimerhütte.
- R52: From Mindelheimerhütte to Schröcken.
- R53: From Schröcken to Buchboden.
- R54: From Buchboden to St. Gerold.
- R55: From St. Gerold to Feldkirch.
- R56: From Feldkirch to Gafadurahütte.
- R57: From Gafadurahütte to Sücka.
- R58: From Sücka to Pfälzerhütte.
- R59: From Pfälzerhütte to Schesaplana Hütte.
- R60: From Schesaplana Hut to Carschinahütte.
- R61: From Carschinahütte to St. Antönien.
- R62: From St. Antönien to Gargellen.
- R63: From Gargellen to Tübinger Hut.
- R64: From Tübinger Hut to Madlener Haus.
- R65: From Madlener Haus to Jamtalhütte.
- R66: From Jamtalhütte to Scuol.
- R67: From Scuol to S-charl.
- R68: From S-charl to Taufers / Tubre.
- R69: From Taufers / Tubre to Stilfs / Stelvio.
- R70: From Stilfs / Stelvio to Stilfser Joch / Passo dello Stelvio.
- R71: From Stilfser Joch / Passo dello Stelvio to Arnoga.
- R72: From Arnoga to Eita.
- R73: From Eita to Malghera.
- R74: From Malghera to Rifugio Schiazzera.
- R75: From Rifugio Schiazzera to Tirano.
- R76: From Tirano to Poschiavo.
- R77: From Poschiavo to Rifugio Zoia (Campo Moro).
- R78: From Rifugio Zoia (Campo Moro) to Chiareggio.
- R79: From Chiareggio to Maloja.
- R80: From Maloja to Juf.
- R81: From Juf to Innerferrera.
- R82: From Innerferrera to Isola.
- R83: From Isola to Pian San Giacomo.
- R84: From Pian San Giacomo to Selma.
- R85: From Selma to Capanna Alpe Cava.
- R86: From Capanna Alpe Cava to Biasca.
- R87: From Biasca to Capanna d'Efra.
- R88: From Capanna d'Efra to Sonogno.
- R89: From Sonogno to Prato Sornico.
- R90: From Prato Sornico to Fontana (Val Bovana).
- R91: From Fontana (Val Bovana) to Robiei.
- R92: From Robiei to Riale.
- R93: From Riale to Ulrichen.
- R94: From Ulrichen to Fieschertal.
- R95: From Fieschertal to Riederalp.
- R96: From Riederalp to Mund.
- R97: From Mund to Gampel / Steg.
- R98: From Gampel / Steg to Leukerbad.
- R99: From Leukerbad to Schwarenbach.
- R100: From Schwarenbach to Adelboden.
- R101: From Adelboden to Lenk.
- R102: From Lenk to Lauenen.
- R103: From Lauenen to Gsteig.
- R104: From Gsteig to Godey.
- R105: From Godey to Anzeindaz.
- R106: From Anzeindaz to Col du Demècre.
- R107: From Col du Demècre to Vernayaz / Pissevache.
- R108: From Vernayaz / Pissevache to Cabane de Susanfe.
- R109: From Cabane de Susanfe to Refuge Tornay-Bostan.
- R110: From Refuge Tornay-Bostan to Salvagny.
- R111: From Salvagny to Refuge de Moëde-Anterne.
- R112: From Refuge de Moëde-Anterne to La Flégère.
- R113: From La Flégère to Trient.
- R114: From Trient to Champex.
- R115: From Champex to Bourg-St-Pierre.
- R116: From Bourg-St-Pierre to Col du Grand-Saint-Bernard.
- R117: From Col du Grand-Saint-Bernard to Cérellaz.
- R118: From Cérellaz to Valgrisenche.
- R119: From Valgrisenche to Refuge de l'Archeboc.
- R120: From Refuge de l'Archeboc to Le Monal.
- R121: From Le Monal to Le Lac de Tignes.
- R122: From Le Lac de Tignes to Refuge de La Leisse.
- R123: From Refuge de La Leisse to Termignon-la-Vanoise.
- R124: From Termignon-la-Vanoise to Modane.
- R125: From Modane to Granges de la Vallée Etroite.
- R126: From Granges de la Vallée Etroite to Névache.
- R127: From Névache to Le Monêtier-les-Bains.
- R128: From Le Monêtier-les-Bains to Vallouise.
- R129: From Vallouise to Freissinières.
- R130: From Freissinières to Mont-Dauphin (Guillestre).
- R131: From Mont-Dauphin (Guillestre) to Refuge de Furfande.
- R132: From Refuge de Furfande to Ceillac.
- R133: From Ceillac to Maljasset.
- R134: From Maljasset to Chiappera.
- R135: From Chiappera to Chialvetta.
- R136: From Chialvetta to Pontebernardo.
- R137: From Pontebernardo to Rifugio Zanotti.
- R138: From Rifugio Zanotti to Strepeis.
- R139: From Strepeis to Sant'Anna di Vinadio.
- R140: From Sant'Anna di Vinadio to Rifugio Malinvern.
- R141: From Rifugio Malinvern to Rifugio Questa.
- R142: From Rifugio Questa to Rifugio Morelli-Buzzi.
- R143: From Rifugio Morelli-Buzzi to Rifugio Ellena-Soria.
- R144: From Rifugio Ellena-Soria to Refuge de la Madone de Fenestre.
- R145: From Refuge de la Madone de Fenestre to Refuge de Nice.
- R146: From Refuge de Nice to Refuge de Valmasque.
- R147: From Refuge de Valmasque to Castérino.
- R148: From Castérino to Limonetto.
- R149: From Limonetto to Rifugio Garelli.
- R150: From Rifugio Garelli to Rifugio Mongioie.
- R151: From Rifugio Mongioie to Ormea.

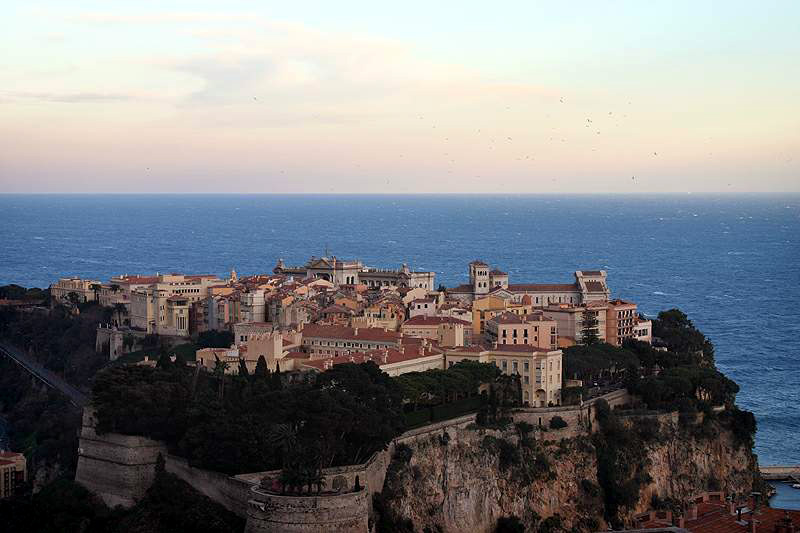
Palais de Monaco, the end of the Red Trail

- R152: From Ormea to Garessio.
- R153: From Garessio to Caprauna.
- R154: From Caprauna to Colle di Nava.
- R155: From Colle di Nava to Colle San Bernardo di Mendatica.
- R156: From San Bernardo di Mendatica to Colla Melosa.
- R157: From Colla Melosa to Saorge.
- R158: From Saorge to Breil-sur-Roya.
- R159: From Breil-sur-Roya to Sospel.
- R160: From Sospel to Peillon.
- R161: From Peillon to Monaco - Place du Palais.
