= Marnaz =

Marnaz Marnâ (Savoyard)
- Commune
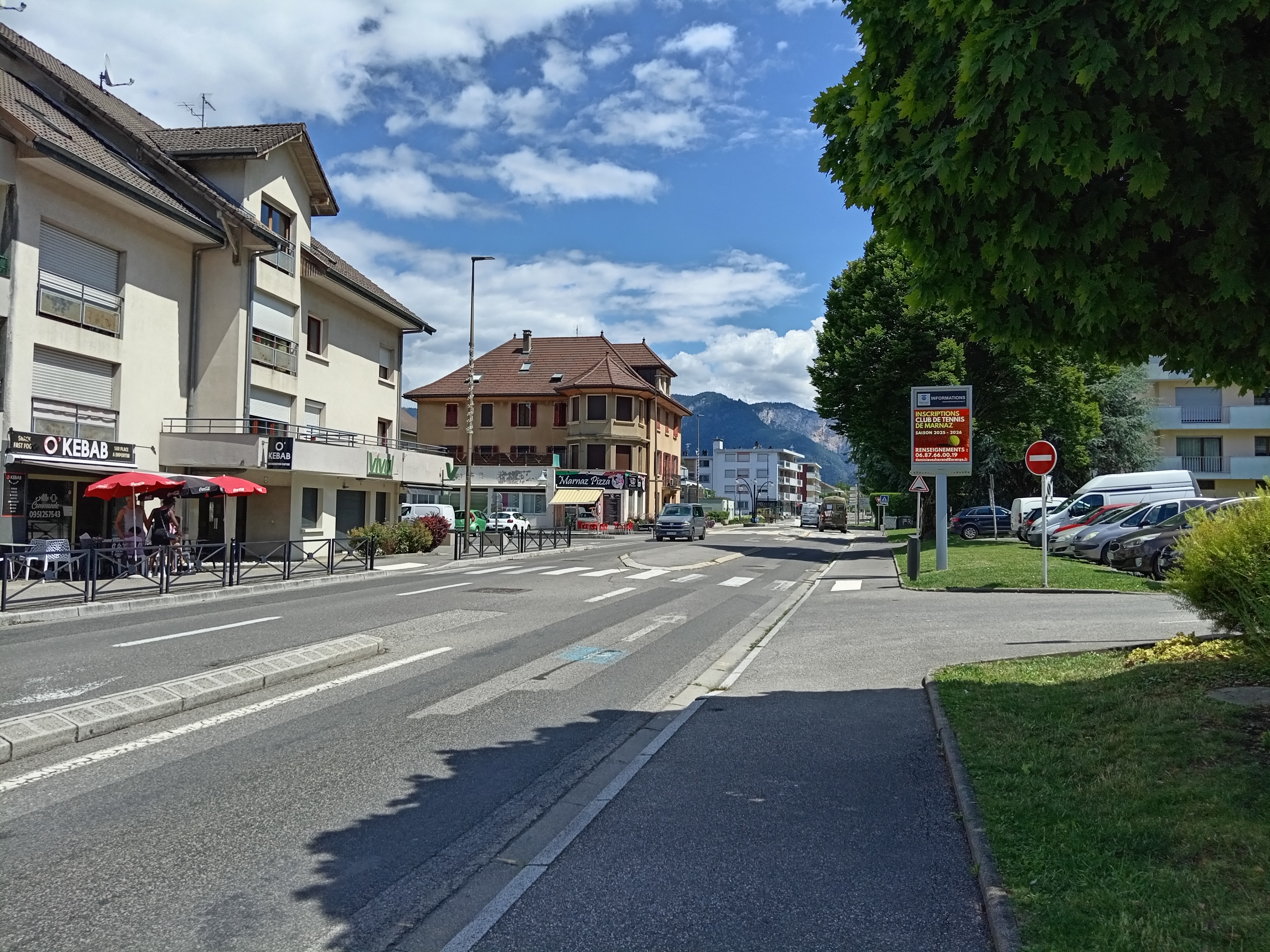

- Coat of arms
- Location of Marnaz
- Location within France Location within Auvergne-Rhône-Alpes
- Coordinates: 46°03′36″N 6°31′36″E
- Country: France
- Region: Auvergne-Rhône-Alpes
- Department: Haute-Savoie
- Arrondissement: Bonneville
- Canton: Cluses

Government
  - Mayor (2020–2026): Chantal Vannson
- Area^{1}: 9.02 km^{2} (3.48 sq mi)
- Highest elevation: 2,098 m (6,883 ft)
- Lowest elevation: 464 m (1,522 ft)
- Population (2023): 5,964
  - Density: 661/km^{2} (1,710/sq mi)
- Demonym: Marnerot / Marnerotte
- Time zone: UTC+01:00 (CET)
  - Summer (DST): UTC+02:00 (CEST)
- INSEE/Postal code: 74169 /74460
- Website: Mairiedemarnaz.fr
- ^{1} French Land Register data, which excludes lakes, ponds, glaciers > 1 km^{2} (0.386 sq mi or 247 acres) and river estuaries.

Marnaz (French pronunciation: [maʁna]; Savoyard: Marnâ) is a commune in the Haute-Savoie department in the Auvergne-Rhône-Alpes region in south-eastern France. It is around 34 km south-east of Geneva.

== Toponymy ==
As with many polysyllabic Arpitan toponyms or anthroponyms, the final -x marks oxytonic stress (on the last syllable), whereas the final -z indicates paroxytonic stress (on the penultimate syllable) and should not be pronounced, although in French it is often mispronounced due to hypercorrection.

== Population ==
Historical population
Year	Pop.	±% p.a.
1968	2,565	—
1975	2,949	+2.01%
1982	3,595	+2.87%
1990	4,019	+1.40%
1999	4,442	+1.12%
2007	5,219	+2.04%
2012	5,147	−0.28%
2017	5,521	+1.41%
2023	5,964	+1.29%
Source: INSEE

== Twin towns ==
Marnaz is twinned with Quincinetto, Italy since 1996.

== See also ==
- Communes of the Haute-Savoie department
