= Grande Traversata delle Alpi =

Hiking trail in Italy

Coordinates: 44.9597°N 7.9194°E

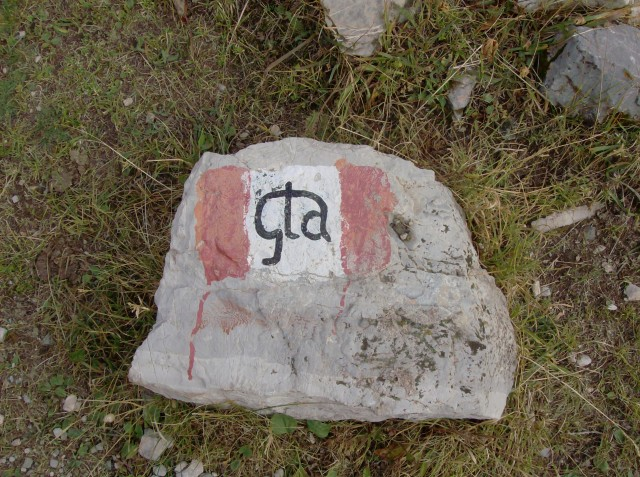
GTA trail marker

The Grande Traversata delle Alpi (GTA) is a long-distance hiking trail in the Italian region of Piedmont. In about 1,000 kilometres (620 mi) and 55 day hikes, it runs through the arc formed by the western Alps from the Pennine Alps through the Graian and Cottian Alps to the Maritime and Ligurian Alps. There are a number of transverse valleys along the route. Day hikes typically connect high-lying valley communities with each other via historic pass routes.

== Route ==
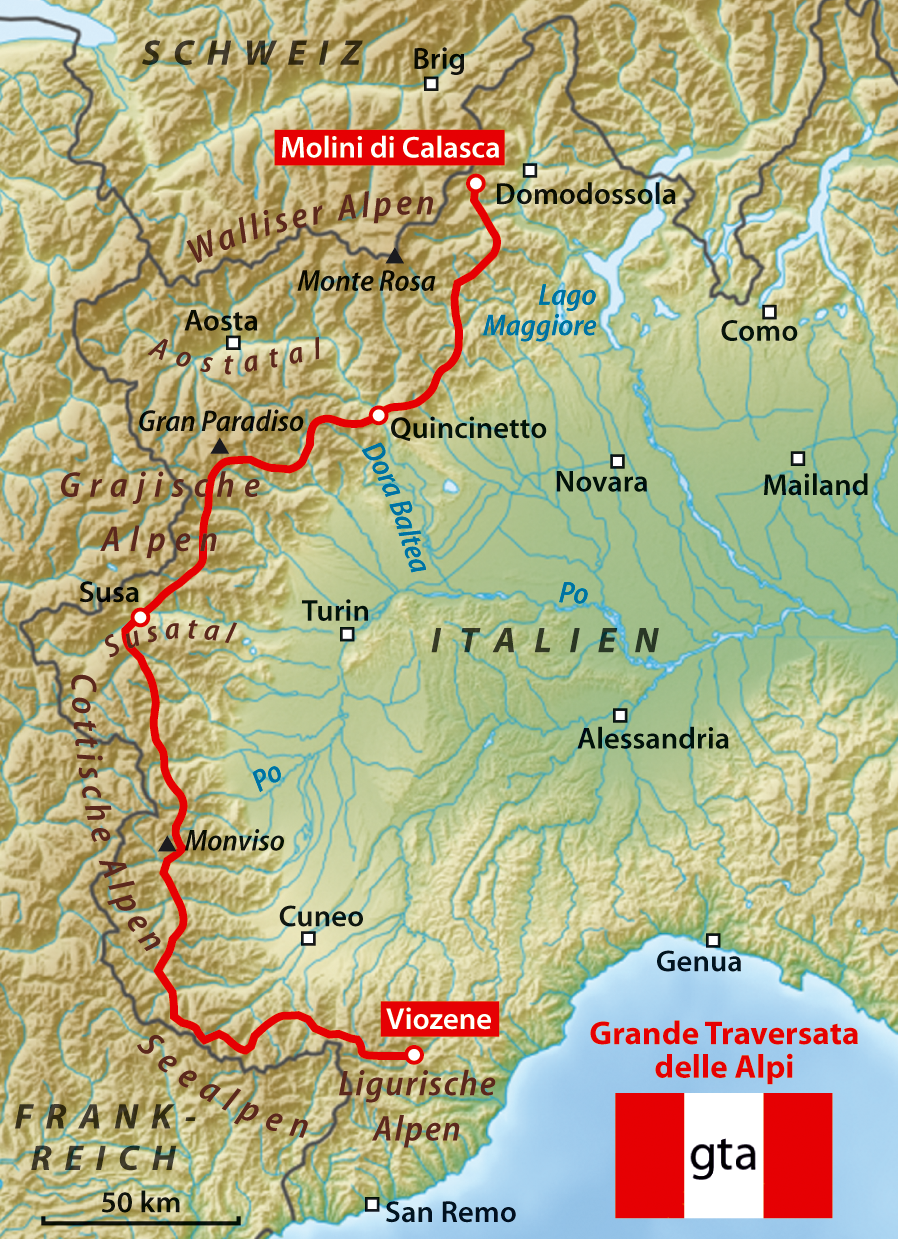
The 55-day length of the GTA

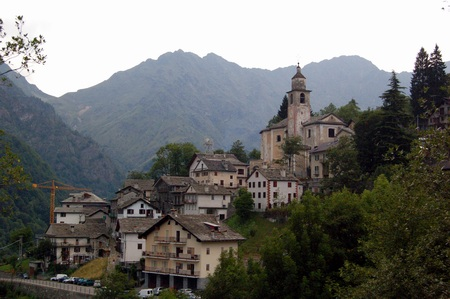
Rimella, at the trail's northern end

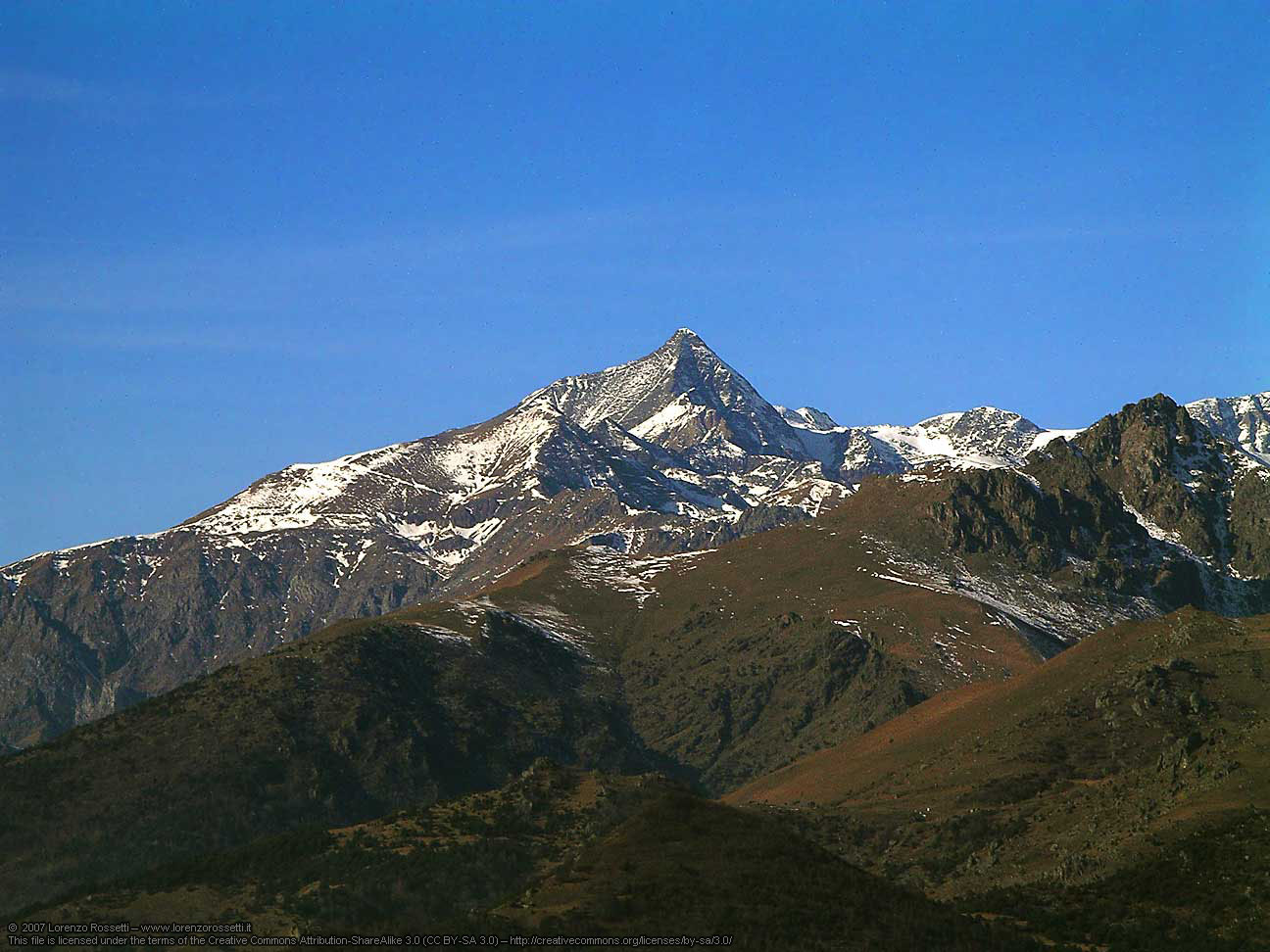
Rocciamelone, at 3,538 metres (11,608 ft) the highest mountain on the GTA that can be climbed as a detour

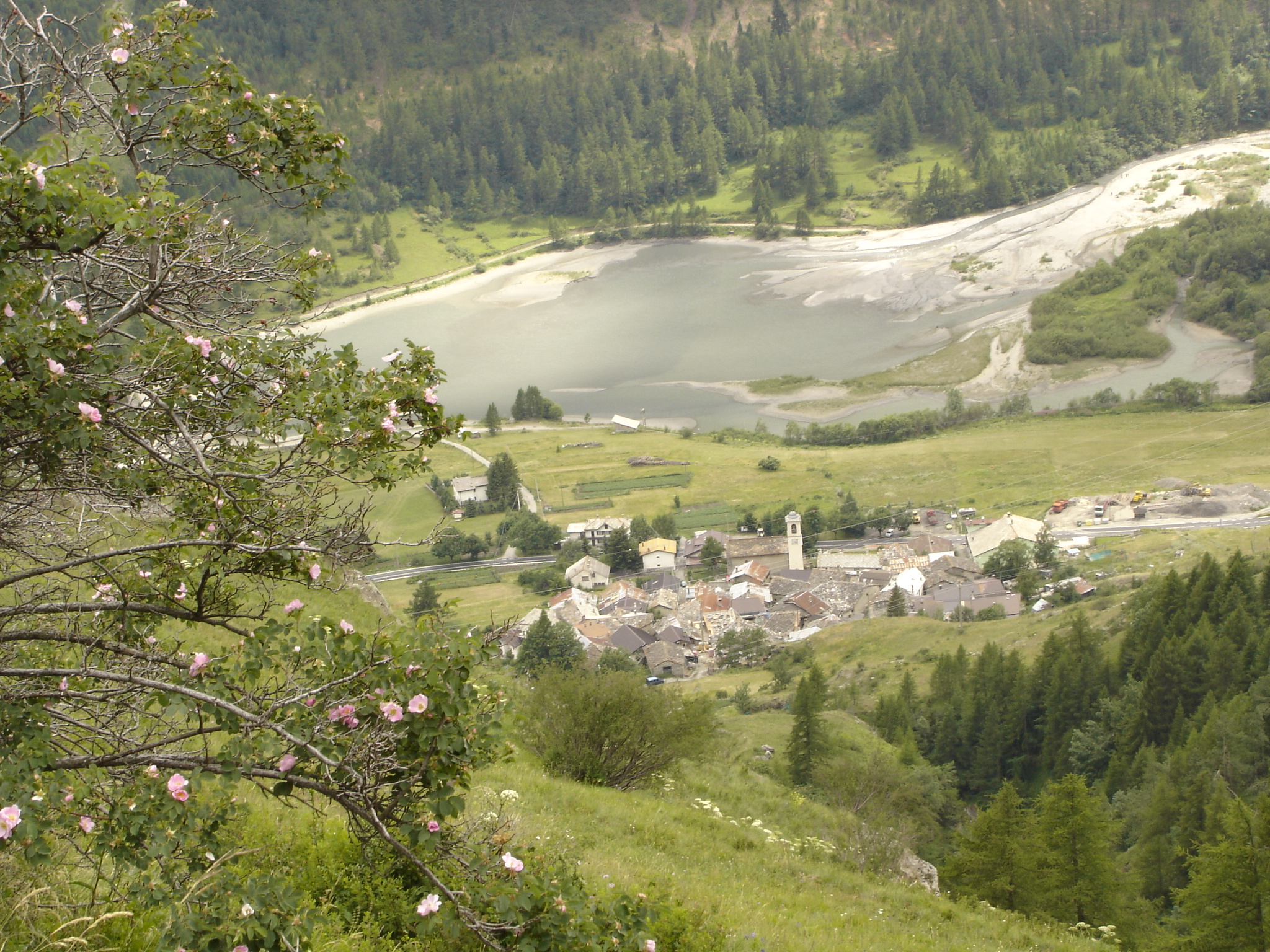
Usseaux in Chisone

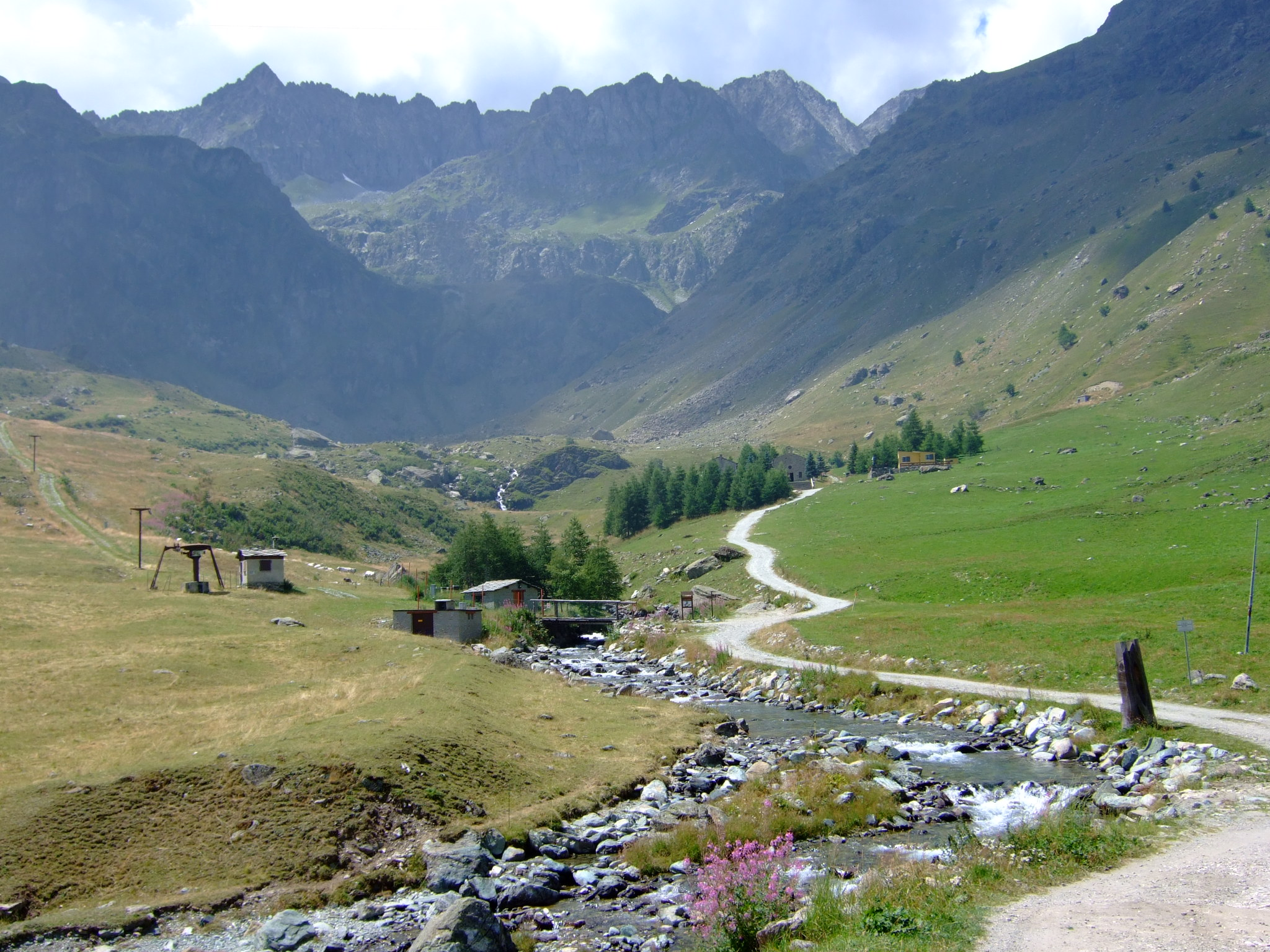
Po Valley

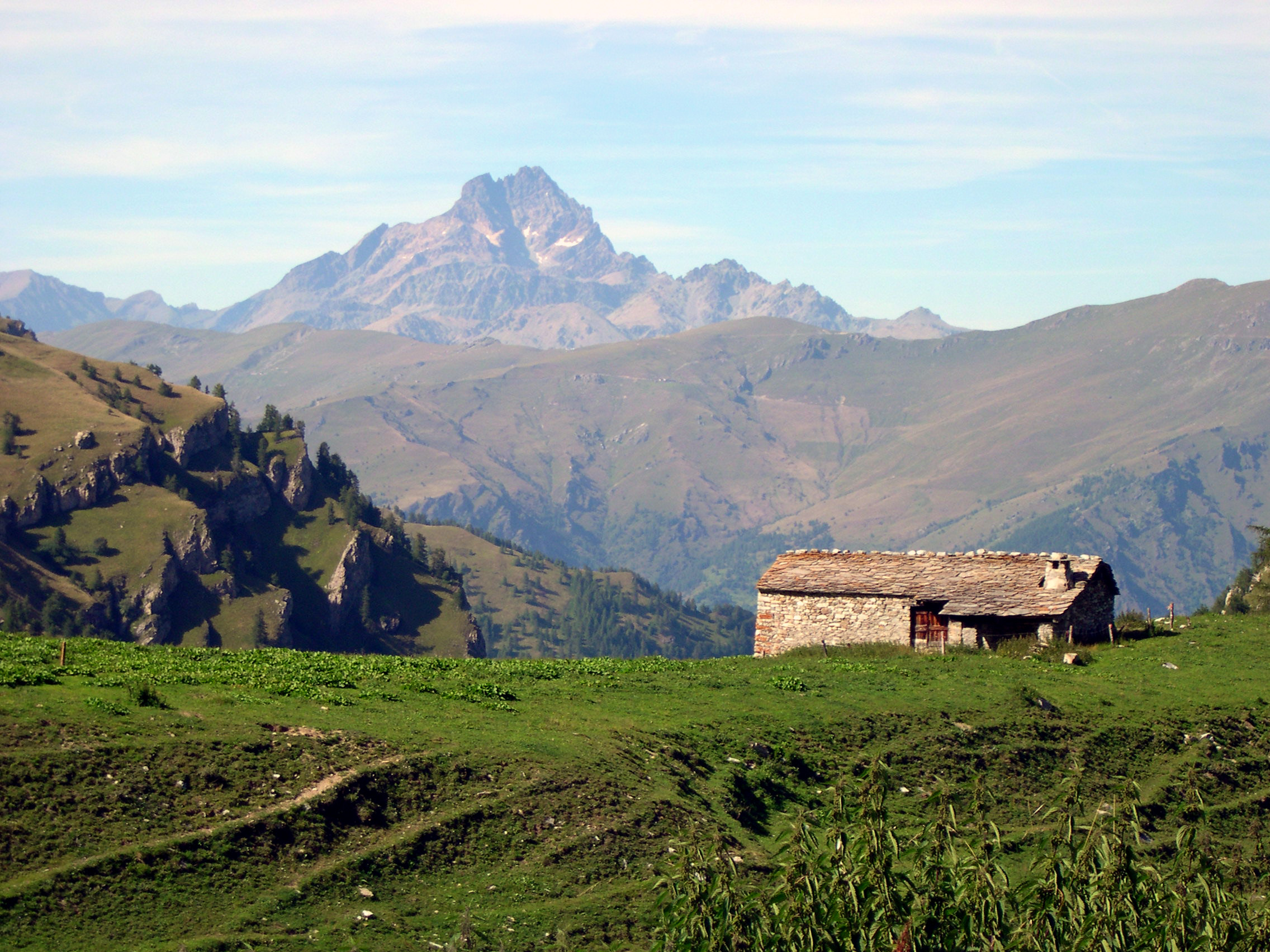
View from Valle Maira of Monte Viso

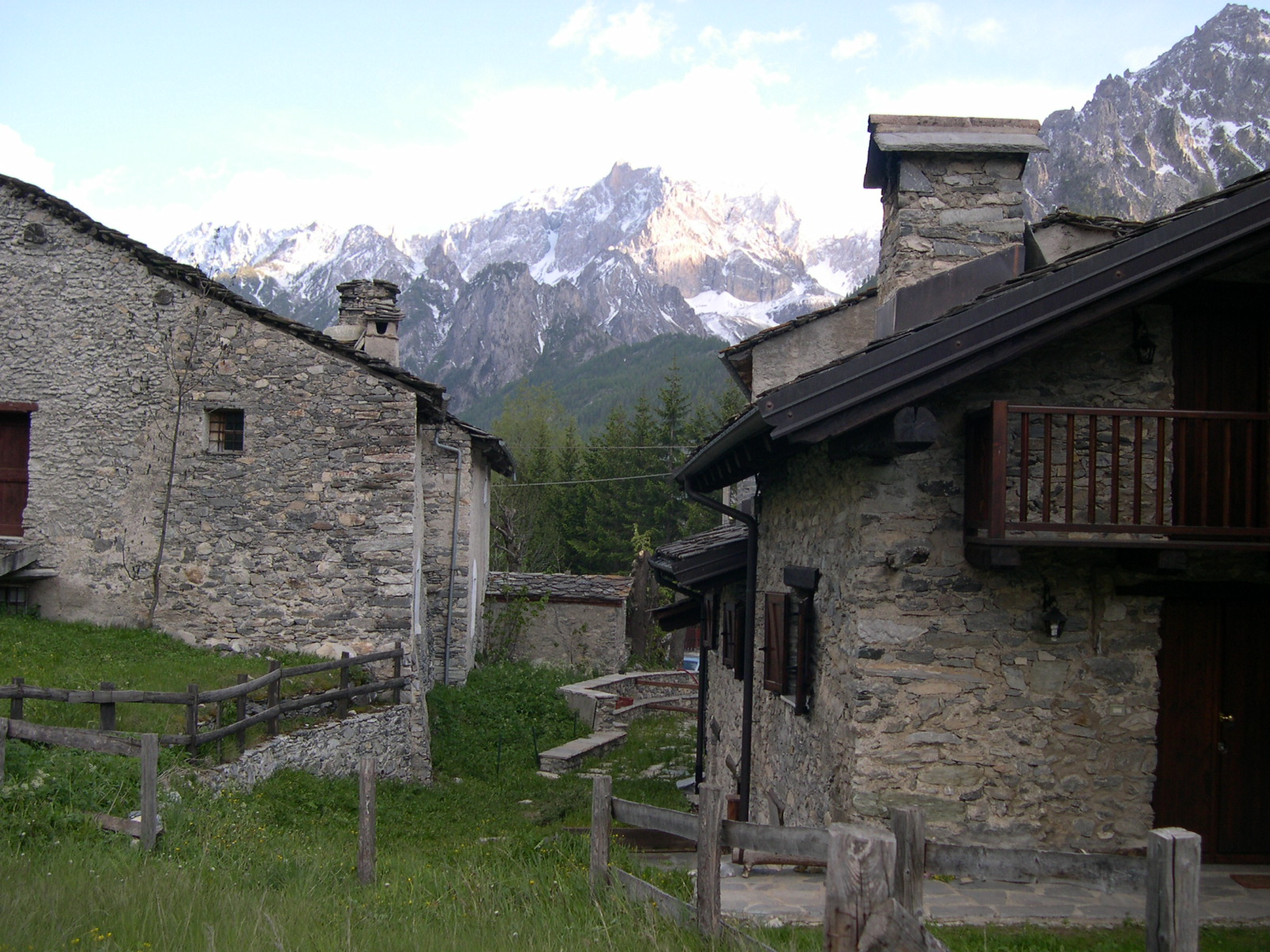
Traditional houses in Chiappera, Acceglio, in the Valle Maira

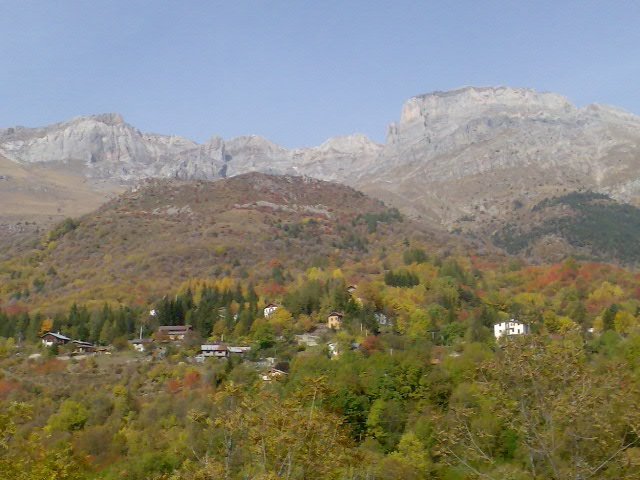
Ormea Viozene, at the south end of the trail

The GTA may be walked in either direction; the following direction is from north to south.

The trail begins in the Pennine Alps; the original plan to let the GTA start on Lago Maggiore has not been implemented due to the lack of suitable accommodations. The official start is at Molini di Calasca in Valle Anzasca; however, Forno in Valstrona is also used, and some walkers start at Valais, Switzerland.

The trail follows the north side of Valsesia to Alagna, near Monte Rosa. There the route bends south, avoiding the Aosta Valley (which is not part of the Piedmont). The trail passes Oropa and reaches Quincinetto, in the valley where the Dora Baltea breaks through from Aosta Valley into the lowlands of the Po. At 295 metres (968 ft), it is the lowest point of the GTA.

The GTA then enters the Graian Alps, leading (in six sections) west. It passes Gran Paradiso near the French border, where it continues south. After crossing the three valleys of Lanzo Torinese, the Susa Valley is reached after 26 sections. This is the approximate midpoint of the GTA, and the boundary between its northern and southern parts.

In the Cottian Alps, between the Susa and Varaita valleys, were several variants of the GTA. An eastern route, snow-free by early June, is neglected; the main, western route is well-maintained. The GTA runs south from the Susa Valley, crossing the Chisone, Germanasca, and Pellice Valleys. The Monte Viso bypass uses two huts belonging to the Club Alpino Italiano. The trail then crosses the Varaita, Maira, Grana, Stura di Demonte, Gesso, and Vermenagna Valleys. Near Monte Argentera, in the Maritime Alps, are several more Club Alpino Italiano huts. The GTA then enters the Ligurian Alps, ending at Viozene in Ormea. Trail extensions continue to the train stations at Ormea or Gerassio, cross to the Alta Via dei Monti Liguri or lead to the Mediterranean Sea (which can be reached in about three days from Ormea).

The GTA is usually snow-free at the end of June. A mountain trail, it has no technical difficulties; however, trail marking is irregular. The typical elevation difference is 600 to 1,200 metres (2,000 to 3,900 ft) per day. Especially in the northern part, some sections are lengthy.

== Accommodations and maps ==
The section between Forno and Viozene may be hiked without camping; accommodations are available (posto tappa, with a red-and-white GTA flag), usually with half board. Some accommodations are simple (for example, a dormitory with bunk beds in an old school house); others are in private homes.

The GTA runs partially along the Sentiero Italia and Via Alpina (red-blue trail). Trail markers are red and white, some with "GTA" or "SI" in black. As part of an EU-funded initiative, Via Alpina boards were set up for each section. However, the trail is difficult to find in large towns and few local residents are familiar with the GTA.

Maps published by the Turin Istituto Centrale Geografico (IGC) are unreliable; entries for trails outside the GTA may be outdated (the trails are overgrown, or blocked by landslides). During the 1990s, a French-Italian joint project published several cross-border 1:50,000-scale maps (with EU support) from the French National Geographic Institute; however, they are out of print. Local maps are sometimes available in scales ranging from 1:40,000 to 1:25,000; their quality varies. A two volume Italian guidebook has been published in 2011 (Southern part, Viozene to Susa) and 2016 (Northern part, Susa to Lago Maggiore).

== Landscape and culture ==
The GTA is a subalpine, montane trail primarily traversing a previously cultivated, densely populated landscape. Traditional mountain farming largely collapsed during the 20th century; areas in the GTA valleys suffered a population decline of 80 percent between 1870 and 2000, and the upper valley communities lost between 90 and 95 percent. Some abandoned hamlets had populations of about 100; others have one or two older residents left. Some descendants of original residents, heirs to property, return to the hamlets during summer as a second home; however, most houses have fallen into disrepair.

The GTA often runs along old roads which formerly connected hamlets; (Note: The communities were organized locally: in a village was the church in another town hall, in yet another school, so each village was connected to any direct way, the routing - a ravine around or up and down to the valley floor again? . - Was optimized for Heel) mulattieras (mule paths) traversed chestnut forests which were destroyed by a 19th-century blight. At higher altitudes, old agricultural terraces and boundary walls may still be seen.

The Alpine valleys were culturally independent, and had contact with neighboring areas in France, Switzerland and the Po Valley. The Valsesia has long been settled by the Walser. In the Lanzo Valleys, as in the Aosta Valley, Arpitan was spoken; in the lower Susa Valley, the language was Piedmontese. South of the Susa Valley, the Occitan language predominated. Only during World War I did a significant part of the population begin speakingItalian. During the second half of the 20th century, there was the decline in regional languages; however, some Occitan speakers still remain in remote valleys. The Waldensian Evangelical Church has a following in the region.

== History ==
The GTA originated from a similar trail in France established about 1970, and is part of a network of European long-distance footpaths traversing the Alps. During the mid-1970s, a group of Turin mountain-hiking enthusiasts expanded the concept of a long-distance path following the Piedmontese Alpine arc around the Rivista della Montagna and libreria della Montagna. The volunteers later formed the Associazione GTA. The associated organized overnight accommodations and marked the trails, attracting public funds. From 1981 to 1989 a hiking guide was published in book form, and in 1982 a formal tour was organized to publicize the trail.

The GTA experienced a boom in 1979, with up to 300 overnight hikers per section per season. After a few years interest by Italian hikers waned, and some posti tappa on the eastern route in the southern part closed. The GTA volunteer base shrank during the 1990s. (Note: In 2008, the Associazione GTA had shrunk to seven members; besides one dedicated member in the province of Cuneo they are largely inactive. Their continued existence is justified by the fact that only allows a licensing embodied connection to this club the shelter, preserve their special status as rifugio escursionistico to maintain order and to avoid more stringent requirements of the hotel and catering law.)

Since 1985, the GTA has been promoted in the German-speaking area of Werner Bätzing as an example of environmentally friendly tourism. The association's hiking guide has been updated regularly since 1989; however, the number of hikers has decreased.

Hikers walk the GTA predominantly from German-speaking regions. The average stay is a week, and there are many returning walkers. The exact number of overnight stays in individual sections is unavailable, but are typically 100 to 200 per season. An estimated 1,000 long-distance hikers walk the GTA each season. (Note: When asked about numbers, suggesting the turnover, the willingness to provide information to the host of a unique. Gap)

== Sections (north to south) ==
=== Pennine (Valais) Alps: Valle Anzasca to Dora Baltea ===
- From Molini di Calasca (480 metres (1,570 ft)) in Valle Anzasca to Alpe del Lago (1,545 metres (5,069 ft))
- From the Colle dell'Usciolo (2,037 metres (6,683 ft)) to Campello Monti (1,305 metres (4,281 ft)) in Valstrona
- From the Bocchetta di Campello (1,924 metres (6,312 ft)) to Rimella (1,176 metres (3,858 ft))
- Santa Maria di Fobello (1,094 metres (3,589 ft))
- From the Colle d'Egua (2,239 metres (7,346 ft)) to Carcoforo (1,304 metres (4,278 ft))
- From the Colle del Termo (2,351 metres (7,713 ft)) to Rima (1,441 metres (4,728 ft))
- Around Colle di Mud (2,324 metres (7,625 ft)), Alpe Valmontasca and Alagna after St. Anthony di Val Vogna
- Around Passo del Maccagno (2,495 metres (8,186 ft)), Colle Lazoney (2,395 metres (7,858 ft)) and Colle Mologna Grande (2,364 metres (7,756 ft)) to Rifugio Rivetti (2,201 metres (7,221 ft))
- San Giovanni d'Andorno (1,020 metres (3,350 ft))
- From the Colle della Colma to Oropa (1,180 metres (3,870 ft))
- To Coda refuge (2,189 metres (7,182 ft))
- Around the Colle della Lace (2,121 metres (6,959 ft)) to Maletto (1,336 metres (4,383 ft))
- To Quincinetto train station (295 metres (968 ft), the GTA's lowest point)

=== Graian and Dora Baltea to the Susa Valley ===
- Scalaro-Le Capanne (1,400 metres (4,600 ft))
- Colle di Lavarossa (2,100 metres (6,900 ft)) to Succinto (1,164 metres (3,819 ft)) in the Val Chiusella
- Bocchetta delle Oche (2,415 metres (7,923 ft)) to Piamprato (1,551 metres (5,089 ft))
- Ronco Canavese (948 metres (3,110 ft)) in the Val Soana
- Crest Colle (2,040 metres (6,690 ft)) to Talosio (1,225 metres (4,019 ft)) in the Valle Ribordone
- Monte Arzola (2,158 metres (7,080 ft)) and the Alpe di Colla (2,171 metres (7,123 ft)) to San Lorenzo di Piantonetto (1,045 metres (3,428 ft))
- Bertodasco (1,175 metres (3,855 ft)), Perebella (1,339 metres (4,393 ft)), Anna S. (1,481 metres (4,859 ft)), Coste (1,193 metres (3,914 ft)) and Fe (900 metres (3,000 ft)) to Noasca (1,058 metres (3,471 ft))
- Ceresole Reale (1,501 metres (4,925 ft)) in the Valle dell'Orco
- Colle della Crocetta (2,641 metres (8,665 ft)) to Pialpetta (1,069 metres (3,507 ft)) in the Val Grande
- Colle di Trione (2,486 metres (8,156 ft)) to Balme (1,432 metres (4,698 ft)) in the Val d'Ala
- Passo Ghicet-Paschiet (2,435 metres (7,989 ft)) to Usseglio (1,265 metres (4,150 ft)) in the Valle di Viù
- Colle Croce di Ferro (2,558 metres (8,392 ft)) near Truc (il Trucco, 1,706 metres (5,597 ft))
- Descent to Susa (600 metres (2,000 ft))

=== Cottian Alps, Susa Valley and the Stura ===
- Susa to Salbertrand (1,032 metres (3,386 ft))
- Testa dell'Assietta (2,567 metres (8,422 ft)) to Usseaux (1,416 metres (4,646 ft)) in Chisone; alternate route Meana di Susa (595 metres (1,952 ft))-Tues Alpeggio Toglie (1,534 metres (5,033 ft))-Colle dell'Orsiera (2,595 metres (8,514 ft)) - Usseaux (1,439 metres (4,721 ft))
- Colle dell'Albergian (2,713 metres (8,901 ft)) to Balsiglia (1,370 metres (4,490 ft); Posto Tappa may be closed)
- Didiero (1,245 metres (4,085 ft)) and Serre Colle Vecchio (1,707 metres (5,600 ft)) to Rodoretto (1,432 metres (4,698 ft))
- Costa di Galmont (1,651 metres (5,417 ft)) to Ghigo di Prali (1,455 metres (4,774 ft), a short stage in the Valle Germanasca)
- Colle Giulian (2,457 metres (8,061 ft)) to Villanova (1,225 metres (4,019 ft)) in Val Pellice (partially destroyed by new road)
- Col del Rifugio Baracun Barbara Lowrie (1,753 metres (5,751 ft))
- Colle della Gianna (2,525 metres (8,284 ft)) to Pian Melzè (1,750 metres (5,740 ft))
- Pian del Re (2,020 metres (6,630 ft)) for Rifugio Quintino Sella (Viso) (2,640 metres (8,660 ft))
- Passo di San Chiaffredo (2,764 metres (9,068 ft)) and Castello (1,608 metres (5,276 ft)) to Pontechianale (1,614 metres (5,295 ft)); western alternate Pian del Re-Col de la Traversette-Refuge du Viso-Passo di Vallanta-Refuge Vallanta-Passo Losetta-Chianale-Colle del Rastel-Pontechianale
- Colletto della Battagliola (2,282 metres (7,487 ft)) to Chiesa di Bellino (1,480 metres (4,860 ft))
- Colle della Bicocca (2,285 metres (7,497 ft)) to Elva (1,637 metres (5,371 ft))
- Colle San Giovanni (1,872 metres (6,142 ft)), Colle Bettone (1,831 metres (6,007 ft)) and San Martino (1,380 metres (4,530 ft)) to Palent (1,480 metres (4,860 ft))
- Celle di Macra (1,270 metres (4,170 ft))
- Monte Bastia (2,134 metres (7,001 ft)) and the Passo delle Crosette (2,180 metres (7,150 ft)) to Santuario di San Magno (1,761 metres (5,778 ft))
- Colle Fauniera (2,480 metres (8,140 ft)) and Col Valcavera (2,416 metres (7,927 ft)) to Sambuco (1,184 metres (3,885 ft))

=== Alps and Ligurian Alps from the Valle Stura Val Tanaro ===
- From Sambuco Caserma del Vaccia and Besmorello to Bagni di Vinadio, at the end of the Chiesa di Bellino
- Passo di Bravaria to Sant'Anna di Vinadio
- Colle della Lombarda and Rifugio Rifugio la Grange Questa; alternate route Sant'Anna di Vinadio-Passo d'Orgials-Malinvern Refuge-Refuge Questa
- Pian del Valasco to Terme di Valdieri (1,368 metres (4,488 ft))
- Refuge Morelli Buzzi (2,351 metres (7,713 ft)) and Colle del Chiapous (2,526 metres (8,287 ft)) to Rifugio Genova-Figari (2,020 metres (6,630 ft))
- Colle delle Fenestrelle (2,463 metres (8,081 ft)) to Rifugio Soria Ellena (1,840 metres (6,040 ft))
- San Giacomo di Entracque (1,213 metres (3,980 ft)) and Caire della Truccia to Trinity of Entracque (1,096 metres (3,596 ft))
- Colle della Garbella (2,170 metres (7,120 ft)) to Palanfrè (1,379 metres (4,524 ft))
- Passo di Ciotto Mieu (2,274 metres (7,461 ft)) to Limonetto (1,294 metres (4,245 ft))
- Colle di Tenda (1,871 metres (6,138 ft)), Colla Piana (2,219 metres (7,280 ft)) and the Passo del Duca (1,989 metres (6,526 ft)) to Rifugio Garelli (1,965 metres (6,447 ft))
- Porta Sestrera (Passo di Lapasse) to Rifugio Giorgio De Havis (1,761 metres (5,778 ft))
- Passo delle Saline (2,174 metres (7,133 ft)) and Rifugio Mongioie (1,520 metres (4,990 ft)) to Viozene (1,245 metres (4,085 ft))
