= Quincinetto =

Quincinetto Quisné (Piedmontese) Kuisnè (Arpitan) Quisnet (French) Quinzenej (Walser)
- Comune
- Comune di Quincinetto
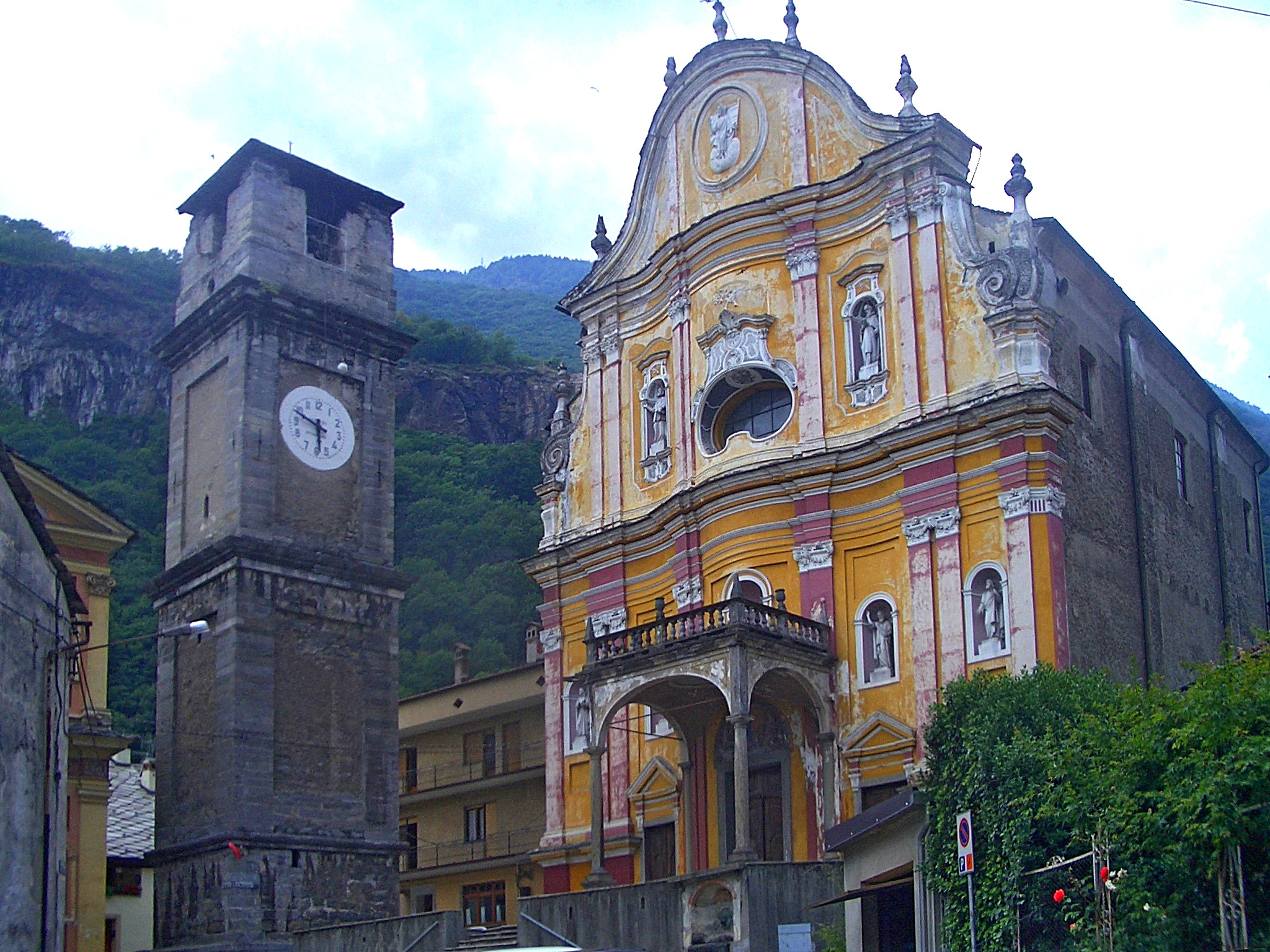
- Parish church

- Coat of arms

- Location within Italy Location within Piedmont
- Coordinates: 45°34′N 7°48′E
- Country: Italy
- Region: Piedmont
- Metropolitan city: Turin (TO)

Government
  - Mayor: Barbara Compagno Zoan

Area
  - Total: 17.8 km^{2} (6.9 sq mi)

Population (2007)
  - Total: 1,054
  - Density: 59.2/km^{2} (153/sq mi)
- Demonym: Quincinettesi
- Time zone: UTC+1 (CET)
  - Summer (DST): UTC+2 (CEST)
- Postal code: 10010
- Dialing code: 0422
- Patron saint: Holy Saviour
- Saint day: Easter Monday

Quincinetto (Piedmontese: Quisné, Arpitan: Kuisnè, French: Quisnet, Walser: Quinzenej) is a comune (municipality) in the Metropolitan City of Turin in the Italian region Piedmont, located about 60 kilometres (37 mi) north of Turin.

== Twin towns ==
- Marnaz, France (1996)
