= Punta Tre Chiosis =

Mountain in the Cozie Alps, Italy

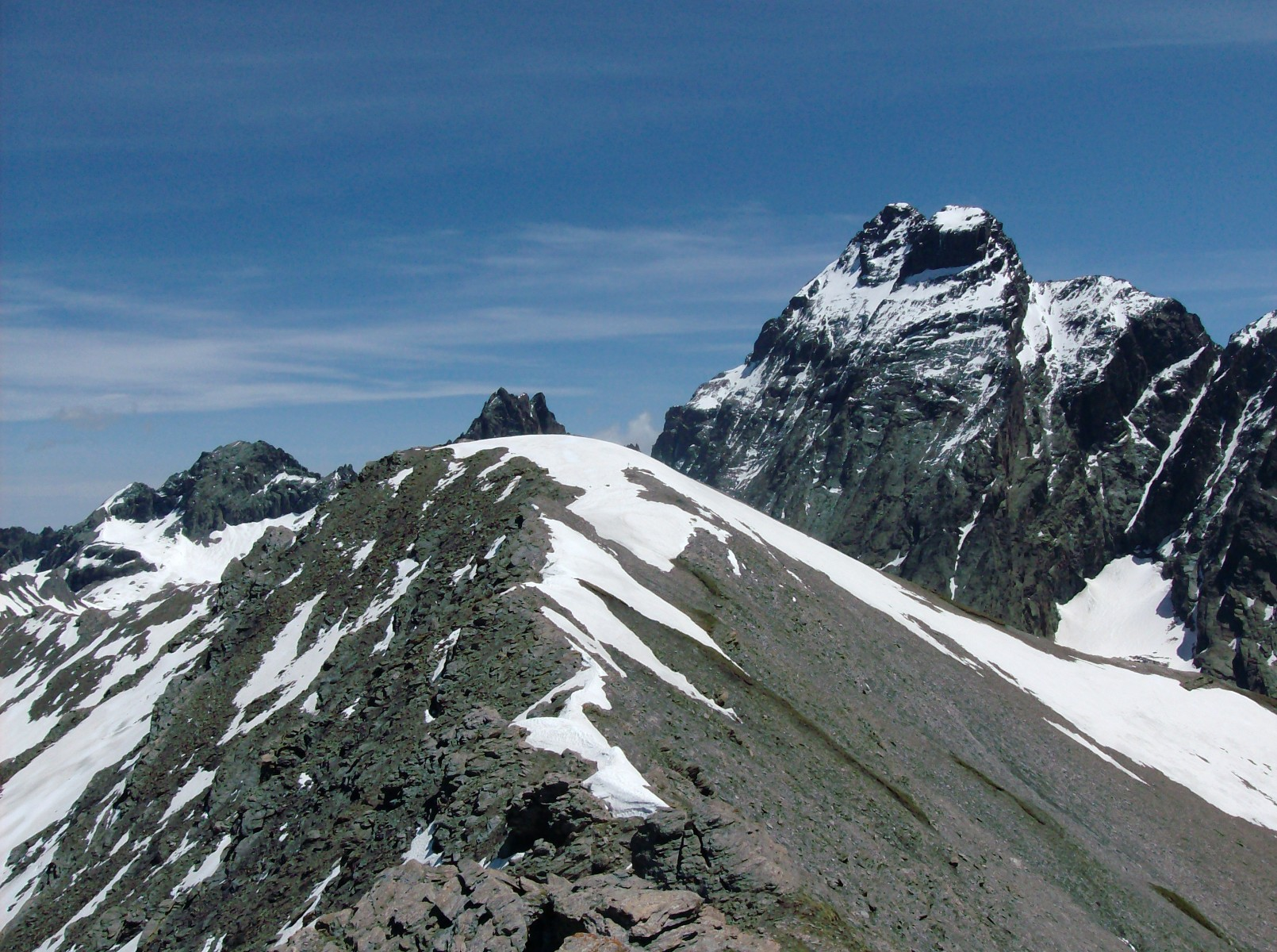
- The summit seen from the secondary peak. In the background, Monviso, Viso di Vallanta, Visolotto, and Punta Gastaldi

Highest point
- Prominence: 240 m (790 ft)
- Coordinates: 44.661111°N 7.048056°E

Geography
- Country: Italy
- Region: Piedmont
- Parent range: Alps

The Punta Tre Chiosis (3,080 m) is a mountain in the Cottian Alps, located in the commune of Pontechianale in the upper Valle Varaita.

== Characteristics ==
It is entirely within the municipal territory of Pontechianale, on the ridge that separates the Vallone di Vallanta to the east from the Valle Varaita di Chianale to the west.

The ridge branches off from the main Alpine watershed at the Monte Losetta. From here, it descends southwest toward the Passo della Losetta, then ascends to the Punta Seras (2,993 m) and continues in the same direction, first descending to a saddle, then reaching the elevation of 2,963 m. Here, it turns sharply south, forms a wide arc with concavity to the west, and, with a general south-southwest direction, reaches the summit of Punta Tre Chiosis at 3,080 m, the highest point of the Vallanta-Chianale ridge. From here, the ridge, known as the Cresta Savaresch, descends with some undulations to the area called Le Conce (approximately 2,400 m), then continues in the same direction with a much steeper slope to the elevation of 2,198 m, where it turns south-southwest and rapidly descends toward the village of Castello.

From the summit, a secondary ridge extends west-southwest to a col and ascends to a secondary peak at 3,054 m, located about 500 m from the main summit. From the 3,054 m elevation, the ridge bifurcates. One branch, known as Costa Ciabert, descends initially west-northwest, then turns west, taking the name Costa Sela, and descends toward the valley floor just above the hamlet of Chianale. The other branch descends southwest, taking the names first Costa Tre Chiosis, then Costa Ciarinosa, to 2,440 m, where it turns south-southwest and descends as Costa Crusas to the Grange Patas in the Vallone di Savaresch, north of the Genzana hamlet of Pontechianale.

Another secondary ridge descends from the 2,963 m elevation westward. Between this ridge and the Costa Ciabert lies the Vallone dei Tre Chiosis; between the Costa Ciabert and the Costa Tre Chiosis is the Vallone del Turri; between the Costa Tre Chiosis and the Costa Savaresch is the Vallone Savaresch. The name Tre Chiosis (in the local Occitan more properly les Tres Chiuzis) refers to these three valleys, enclosed to the east by the mountain's mass.

The summit is a broad, rounded detrital ridge, with its highest point marked by a metal cross placed by the Savigliano section of the CAI in 2014. From the summit, there is a close and detailed view of the western slope of the Monviso group, with particular prominence given to the Viso di Vallanta, the Visolotto, the Punta Gastaldi, and the ridge descending from the Monviso summit to the Punta Caprera.

The geological structure of the mountain is generally homogeneous. The entire Vallanta-Chianale ridge is composed of micaceous and phyllitic calcschists from the Jurassic-Cretaceous belonging to the ophiolitic calcschist complex.

== Ascent to the summit ==
The normal route is a hiking route, entirely on dirt roads and trails. The starting point is the Genzana hamlet of Pontechianale, where one can optionally use the Rifugio Savigliano as a base. From here, following the dirt service road that ascends the Vallone di Savaresch, one reaches the arrival station of the Tre Chiosis chairlift. From here, one continues until reaching the ridge just below the Cima delle Conce (2,429 m). At this point, turn left and follow a trail that ascends the ridge, bypassing some rough sections on the Chianale valley side; the trail follows the entire Costa Savaresch for about 3 km, offering a stunning view of the western slope of the Monviso group. At the base of the final slope, near the ruins of a military shelter, the trail turns left and, ascending diagonally, reaches the ridge separating the summit from the 3,054 m elevation; from here, the true summit is reached shortly. The route has an overall difficulty rated as E.

The same route can be followed, though with some difficulty, by mountain bike.

A more direct route involves following the road to the junction for the Sentiero Lanzetti; from here, one ascends directly along the southwest ridge to the 3,054 m elevation and then to the summit. This route is almost entirely off-trail and has a difficulty of EE.

=== Winter access ===
The mountain is accessible in winter with both snowshoes and skis. With snowshoes, it is possible to ascend following the summer route along the Costa Tre Chiosis; with skis, one can follow this same route, or ascend via the Vallone Tre Chiosis. In the latter case, one ascends the Vallone di Soustra and then the Vallone Tre Chiosis, aiming directly for the summit or the 2,963 m elevation. If able to ascend mechanically to the chairlift's arrival station, it is also interesting to ascend from there to the Cresta Savaresch, then follow it to the summit along the summer normal route, descending afterward to the base of the Vallone di Savaresch. Ascending the same vallone is also a possible variant for ski access.

== Bibliography ==
- Cartografia ufficiale italiana dell'Istituto Geografico Militare (IGM) at scales 1:25,000 and 1:100,000, available online
- Sistema Informativo Territoriale della provincia di Cuneo, based on 1:10,000 cartography
- Istituto Geografico Centrale – Carta dei sentieri 1:50,000 no. 6 Monviso and 1:25,000 no. 106 Monviso – Sampeyre – Bobbio Pellice
