= Visolotto =

Mountain in Piedmont, Italy

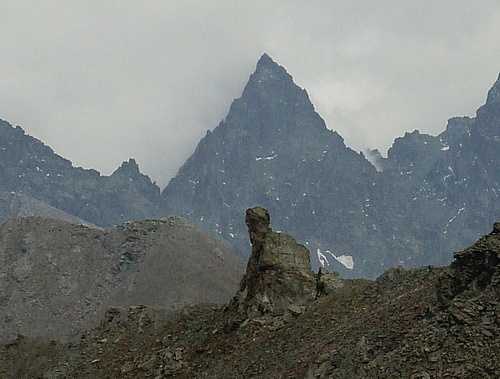

Highest point
- Elevation: 3,348 m (10,984 ft)
- Prominence: 179 m (587 ft)
- Coordinates: 44°40′33″N 7°05′07″E

Geography
- Location within Italy
- Location: Province of Cuneo
- Country: Italy
- Region: Piedmont
- Parent range: Cottian Alps

Climbing
- First ascent: September 4, 1875

Visolotto is a 3,348-metre (10,984 ft) high mountain in the Cottian Alps, located in Piedmont, north of Monviso.

== Features ==
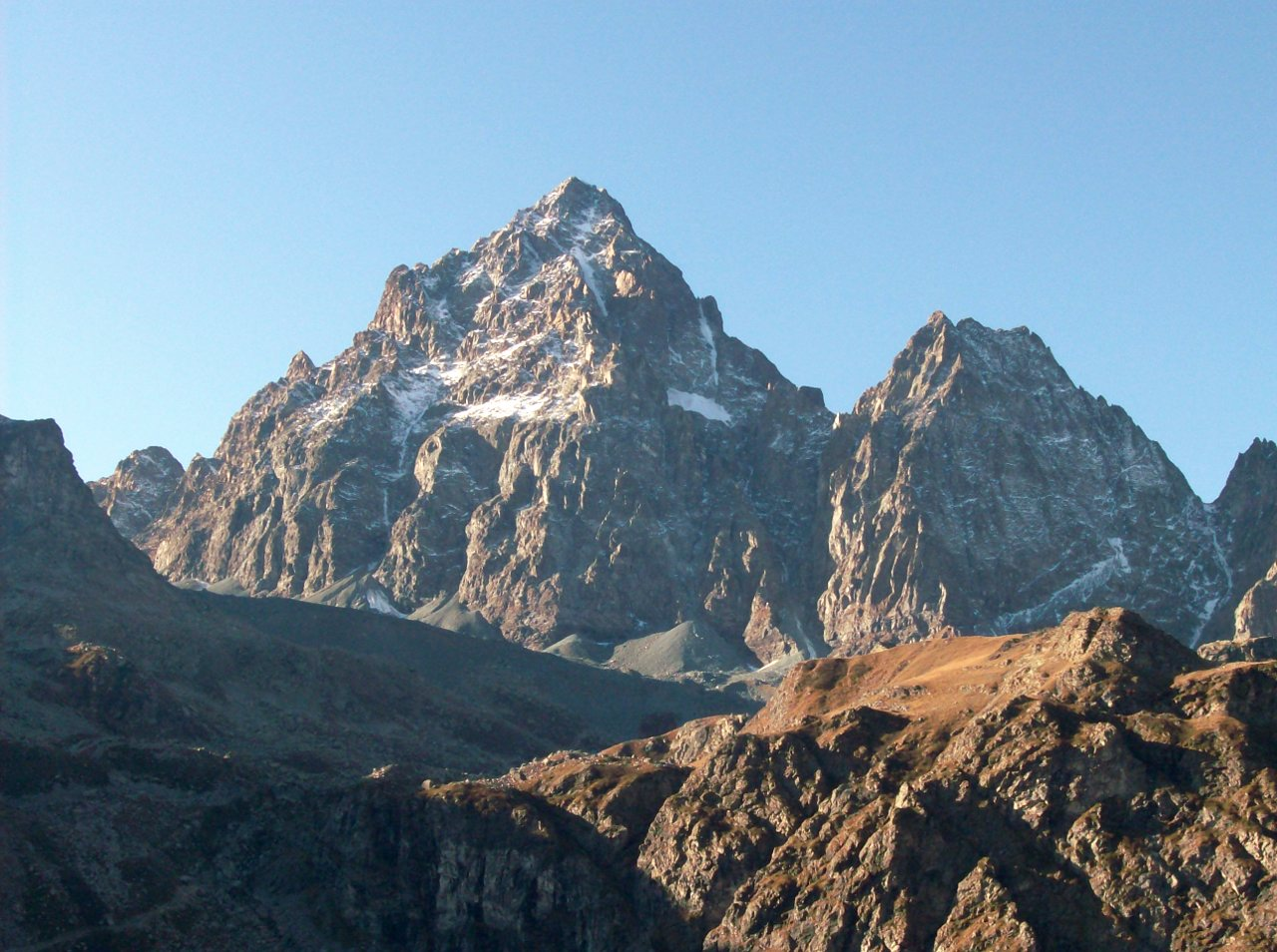
Monviso and Visolotto: eastern slope

It is located slightly north of Monviso from which it is separated by the Cadreghe di Viso, rocky structures with the peculiar shape of chairs (cadreghe in the Piedmontese language). During clear weather days it is easily recognizable even from the Turin plain. The peak, entirely in Italian territory, is on the ridge separating the Varaita valley from the Po valley, on the border between the municipal territories of Pontechianale and Crissolo.

The summit has three distinct peaks: the Lanino Peak (3,348 m (10,984 ft) a.s.l.) or West Peak, the Coolidge Peak (3,340 m (10,958 ft) a.s.l.) or Central Peak and the Montaldo Peak (3,344 m (10,971 ft) a.s.l.) or East Peak. Lanino and Coolidge Peaks are separated from Montaldo Peak by 200 metres (660 ft) of a rather rugged ridge.

Geologically, the dominant rock type on Visolotto is epidote amphibolite, a regional metamorphic rock with basic chemism that is light green streaked with yellow-green (the same rock type also found on the summit of Monviso).

For a long time the mountain was considered 'inaccessible,' and because of its steep slopes it has no easy access routes. The normal route is mountaineering, with a difficulty rated in AD with a grade III passage on rock.

== First ascents and the Montaldo-Coolidge dispute ==
The first ascent dates back to September 4, 1875 and was completed by engineer Felice Montaldo of the CAI of Susa, Antonio Castagneri of Balme (guide) and Francesco Perotti (carrier) on Montaldo Peak. The three followed the most direct route for the ascent, namely the northern face of the mountain (the one overlooking the Po Valley). However, the choice of the route was not very judicious, as the north face had and still has the shortcoming of being continually subject to rock falls and also, because of its orientation, was covered with snow and ice until late summer. The second ascent of Visolotto, again to Picco Montaldo following more or less the same route, was made in 1877 by three masons from Paesana: Battista Bertorello, Cristoforo and Giovanni Picca (father and son). They, having reached the top of Montaldo Peak (the East one), stuck an Italian flag into the rock.

The first ascent to the other two peaks (the central and western ones) was made by William Auguste Coolidge with guides Christian Almer and Ulrich Almer on July 31, 1881. This roped party thus traversed the entire summit ridge of Visolotto for the first time and also made the first traverse of the mountain since the descent was made along the easier south face (i.e., towards the Vallanta valley in the Varaita valley). This event caused some discussion between the Italian trio and the American mountaineer as to who should be considered the first climber of Visolotto. Coolidge, in fact, despite being an already established mountaineer and the author of numerous first ascents, in no way intended to give up the glory of stripping Visolotto of its proud virginity. To try to explain his reasons, the American wrote in the Alpine Journal (the newsletter of the English Alpine Club) a very harsh and polemical speech:

From the moment (1881) that I made it I have never ceased to claim this honor, as I still claim it today. During my ascent of Monviso by the NE slope on July 28, 1881, I had noticed that the stick on Visolotto (put up by Montaldo, ed.) was not on the highest point so that on July 31 I set out [...] with the intention of stripping Visolotto of its proud virginity since it had never occurred to me that it could only even be discussed or doubted that the summit of a mountain is its high point. I do not accept Mr. Ratti's statement that my route is almost identical with that of Mr. Montaldo, since my guides and I reached the last ridge at a point where in order to pass on the East summit (Montaldo) we needed to descend into a notch. [...] So the Visolotto belongs to me [...], although I recognize now, as always, that Mr. Montaldo made the "first exploration" of it, while my run was the "first complete and definitive ascent".

— William Auguste Coolidge, Le Alpi

On August 29, 1892, mountaineer Giuseppe Lanino, accompanied by guides Claudio and Giuseppe Perotti, reached the West Peak (the one that today bears the name Lanino Peak) opening a new route along the northwest face and west ridge of Visolotto.

The first winter ascent was made by Pietro Ravelli, Marie and Emanuele Andreis on March 19, 1938.

== Alpine refuges ==
The following shelters can be used for the ascent to the summit:

- East and north slopes:
  - Bivacco Carlo Villata (2,741 m (8,993 ft)) in the upper Valle Po
- Normal route:
  - Rifugio Vallanta (2,450 m (8,038 ft)) in the upper Varaita Valley
  - Rifugio Viso (2,460 m (8,071 ft)) in the Queyras Valley (France).

== See also ==
- Cottian Alps
- Monte Viso

== Bibliography ==
- Official IGM cartography scale 1:25,000 and 1:100,000, available on the Portale Cartografico Nazionale
- Istituto Geografico Centrale, Carta dei sentieri scala 1:50.000 n.6 Monviso, and scale 1:25.000 n. 106 Monviso - Sampeyre - Bobbio Pellice
- Sistema Informativo Territoriale della Provincia di Cuneo, with 1:10,000 map base
- ALP Grandi Montagne n. 16/217, Monviso, CDA & Vivalda publishers, July-August 2003
