= John Macleod (physiologist) =

Scottish biochemist and physiologist (1876–1935)

John Macleod FRS FRSE
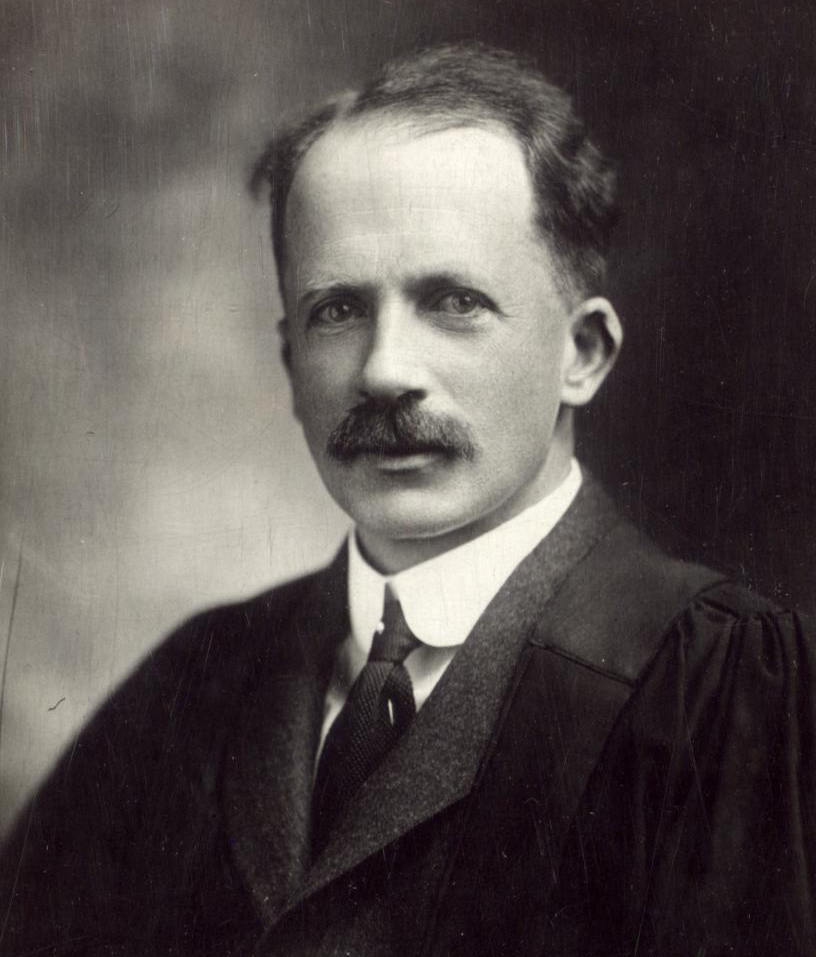
- John Macleod c. 1928
- Born: 6 September 1876; Clunie, Perthshire, Scotland
- Died: 16 March 1935 (aged 58); Aberdeen, Scotland
- Education: University of Aberdeen; University of Leipzig
- Known for: Co-discovery of insulin
- Spouse: Mary Watson McWalter (m. 1903)
- Awards: Nobel Prize in Physiology or Medicine (1923); Cameron Prize for Therapeutics of the University of Edinburgh (1923)
- Scientific career
- Fields: Medicine
- Workplaces: Case Western Reserve University; University of Toronto; University of Aberdeen

John James Rickard Macleod (6 September 1876 – 16 March 1935), was a Scottish biochemist and physiologist. He devoted his career to diverse topics in physiology and biochemistry, but was chiefly interested in carbohydrate metabolism. He is noted for his role in the discovery and isolation of insulin during his tenure as a lecturer at the University of Toronto, for which he and Frederick Banting received the 1923 Nobel prize in Physiology or Medicine. Awarding the prize to Macleod was controversial at the time, because according to Banting's version of events, Macleod's role in the discovery was negligible. It was not until decades after the events that an independent review acknowledged a far greater role than was attributed to him at first.

== Biography ==
Macleod was born in Clunie, near Dunkeld in Perthshire. Soon after he was born, his father Robert Macleod, a minister of the Free Church, was transferred to Aberdeen, where John attended Aberdeen Grammar School and enrolled in the study of medicine at the University of Aberdeen. At the University of Aberdeen, one of MacLeod's principal teachers was the young professor John Alexander MacWilliam. He was awarded his medical degree with honours in 1898 and then spent a year studying biochemistry at the University of Leipzig, Germany, on a travelling scholarship. He became a demonstrator at the London Hospital Medical School, where in 1902 he was appointed lecturer in biochemistry. In the same year, he was awarded a diploma in public health from Cambridge University. Around that time he published his first research article, a paper on phosphorus content in muscles.

In 1903, Macleod became a lecturer in physiology at the Western Reserve University in Cleveland, Ohio, where he remained for 15 years. This was the period when he developed an interest in carbohydrate metabolism that was to last for the rest of his career.

In 1910, he delivered a lecture on various forms of experimental diabetes and their significance for diabetes mellitus at the joint meeting of the section on Pharmacology and Therapeutics and the section on Pathology and Physiology of the American Medical Association.

In 1916, he was a Professor of Physiology at McGill University in Montreal, Canada. After the First World War, he went on to teach physiology at the University of Toronto, where he became director of the physiology lab and an assistant to the dean of the medical faculty, Thorburn Brailsford Robertson. He researched various topics in physiology and biochemistry, among which were the chemism of Mycobacterium tuberculosis, electroshocks, creatinine metabolism and blood circulation in the brain.

In 1905 he became interested in carbohydrate metabolism and diabetes, publishing a series of scientific papers and several monographs on the subject from then on. Additionally, Macleod was a popular lecturer and an influential contributor to the development of the six-year course in medicine at the University of Toronto.

=== Frederick Banting and the discovery of insulin ===
At the end of 1920, Macleod was approached by Frederick Banting, a young Canadian physician who had the idea of curing diabetes using an extract from a pancreas whose functioning had been disrupted. Macleod was not enthusiastic, because (unlike Banting) he knew about unsuccessful experiments in this direction by other researchers. He thought it more likely that the nervous system had a crucial role in regulating blood glucose concentration. Even though Banting had virtually no experience of physiology, he managed to convince Macleod to lend him laboratory space during a holiday in Scotland that summer. In addition to the laboratory, Macleod provided experimental animals and his student Charles Best, who worked as a demonstrator. Macleod also advised on project planning and the use of analytical techniques, and assisted with the operation on the first dog. While Macleod was away, Banting and Best achieved a breakthrough: they isolated an internal secretion of the pancreas and succeeded in reducing the blood sugar level of another dog, whose pancreas had been surgically removed.

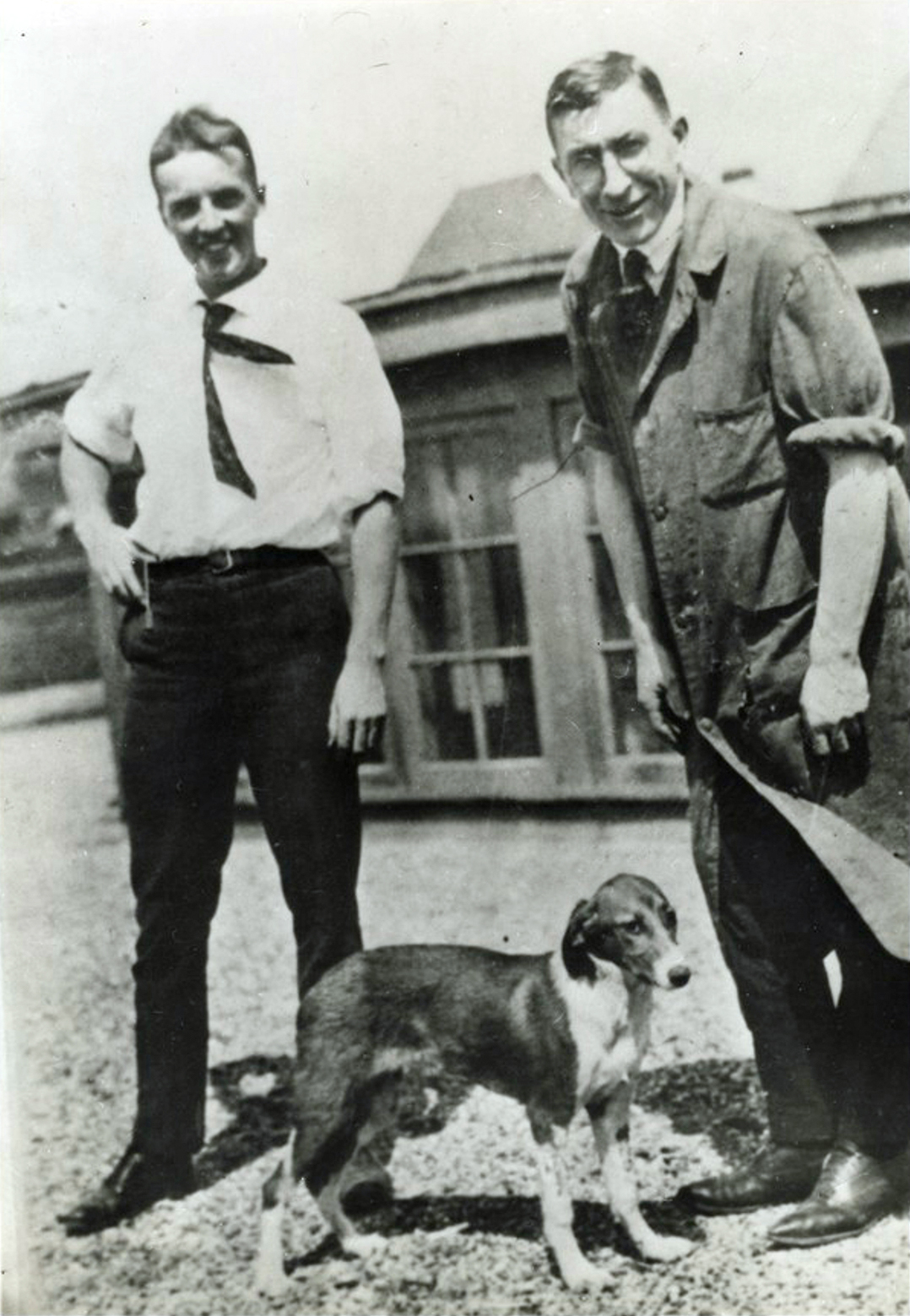
Charles Best and Frederick Banting, with Dog 408, August 1921.

On his return, Macleod was surprised and expressed doubt about the results. Banting took this as an attack on his integrity. They argued bitterly, but Banting finally accepted Macleod's instruction that further experiments were needed, and he even convinced Macleod to provide better working conditions and to give him and Best a salary. Further experiments were successful and the three started to present their work at meetings. Macleod was a far better orator, and Banting came to believe that he wanted to take all the credit. This was exemplified by a December 1921 presentation to the American Physiological Society at Yale, which took a toll on Banting's nerves due to the "prestige of the audience" causing him to freeze up, and as a result the "audience was highly critical of the findings presented". Macleod who was "desperate to snatch victory from the jaws of defeat" stepped in and finished the presentation. From Banting's viewpoint, "this was a brazen coup by Macleod to rob him of the credit for having discovered insulin – and to rub salt into the wound, it had been done in front of the most eminent doctors in the field".

Their discovery was first published in the February 1922 issue of The Journal of Laboratory and Clinical Medicine. Macleod declined co-authorship because he considered it Banting's and Best's work. Despite their success, there remained the issue of how to get enough pancreas extract to continue the experiments. Together, the three researchers developed alcohol extraction, which proved to be far more efficient than other methods. This convinced Macleod to divert the whole laboratory to insulin research and to bring in the biochemist James Collip to help with purifying the extract.

The first human clinical trial was unsuccessful. Banting was insufficiently qualified to participate and felt sidelined. By the winter of 1922, he was certain that all Macleod's colleagues were conspiring against him. There was a reported physical altercation between Banting and Collip, as Banting saw Collip's breakthrough on alcohol purification as a threat, while Collip was reluctant to share the details. Collip threatened to leave because of the strained atmosphere but the encouragement of others who saw the potential of their research prevented escalation of the conflict. In January 1922, the team performed the first successful clinical trial, on 13-year-old Leonard Thompson, and it was soon followed by others.

Although all the team members were listed as co-authors of their publications, Banting still felt overlooked, because Macleod took over the coordination of clinical trials and the acquisition of larger amounts of extract. Macleod's presentation at a meeting of the Association of American Physicians in Washington, D.C., on 3 May 1922 received a standing ovation, but Banting and Best refused to participate in protest. At that time, demonstrations of the method's efficiency drew huge public interest, because the effect on patients, especially children, who until then were bound to die, seemed almost miraculous. The pharmaceutical company Eli Lilly & Co. took over mass production, but without an exclusive license, as the patent was transferred to the Medical Research Council to prevent exploitation.

In the summer of 1923 Macleod resumed other research. He took interest in teleost fish, which have separate regions of islet and acinar tissue in their pancreas. Working at the Marine Biological Station in St. Andrews, New Brunswick, he made extracts from each of those parts separately and proved that insulin is derived from the insular and not the acinar tissue of the pancreas. Meanwhile, Banting remained in Toronto and relationships soon deteriorated again because of conflicting press accounts. Banting eventually started to claim that he deserved all the credit and that Macleod had only hindered him the whole time and had made no contribution other than to leave the keys to the laboratory when he went on vacation. MacLeod wrote a report on the discovery in 1922 to explain his side of the story, but otherwise refrained from active involvement in controversy about credit. Banting hated him passionately, and the two never spoke again. When Macleod left the University of Toronto in 1928, Banting harbored such enmity that he refused to attend the farewell dinner for Macleod.

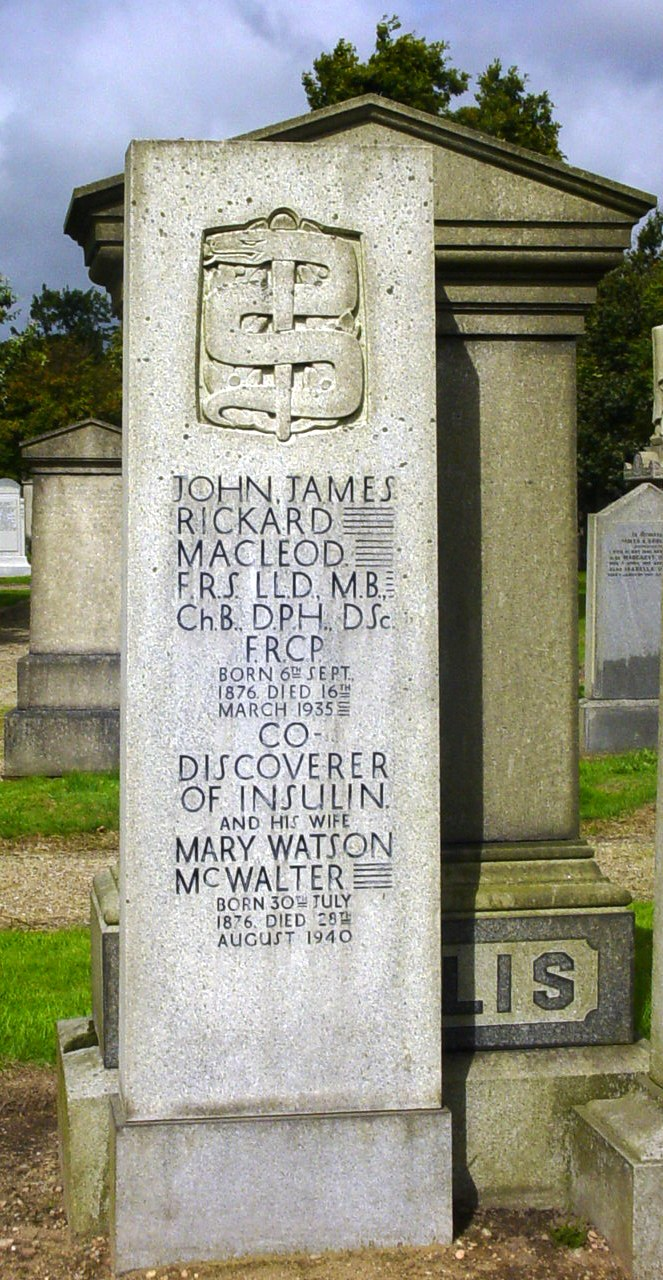
Grave of Macleod and his wife at Aberdeen cemetery

=== Later years ===
Macleod returned to Scotland in 1928 to become Regius Professor of Physiology at the University of Aberdeen (in succession to his former teacher, John Alexander MacWilliam who retired in 1927) and later Dean of the University of Aberdeen Medical Faculty. Between 1929 and 1933 he was also a member of the Medical Research Council.

Macleod did not continue to work on insulin, but he remained active as a researcher, lecturer and author. His last major contribution was a proof that the central nervous system does have an important role in maintaining carbohydrate metabolism balance, as was his original hypothesis. His theory about conversion of fats into carbohydrates remained unproven, despite his provision of several indirect proofs. He devoted his spare time to golf, motorcycling and painting.

He married Mary Watson McWalter (1876–1940) in 1903, but they never had children. He died in 1935 in Aberdeen after several years of suffering from arthritis, despite which he remained active almost until his death. In 1933 he made a lecture tour of the US, and in 1934 he published the 7th edition of his book Physiology and Biochemistry in Modern Medicine.

== Works ==
Macleod was a prolific writer. His first academic article was a paper on phosphorus content in muscles published in 1899. During his career he authored or co-authored over 200 papers and eleven books. Among them are:

- Practical Physiology (1903)
- Recent Advances in Physiology (with Leonard E. Hill, 1905)
- Diabetes: its Pathological Physiology (1913)
- Physiology for dental students (with R. G. Pearce, 1915)
- Physiology and Biochemistry in Modern Medicine (1st edition 1918)
- Insulin and its Use in Diabetes (with W. R. Campbell, 1925)
- Carbohydrate Metabolism and Insulin (1926)
- The Fuel of life: Experimental Studies in Normal and Diabetic Animals (1928)
- Macleod, J.J.R., "Gluconeogenesis and the Energy Material of Muscle", The Australian Journal of Experimental Biology and Medical Science, Vol.9, No.1, (January 1932), pp. 119-125.

== Awards and honours ==
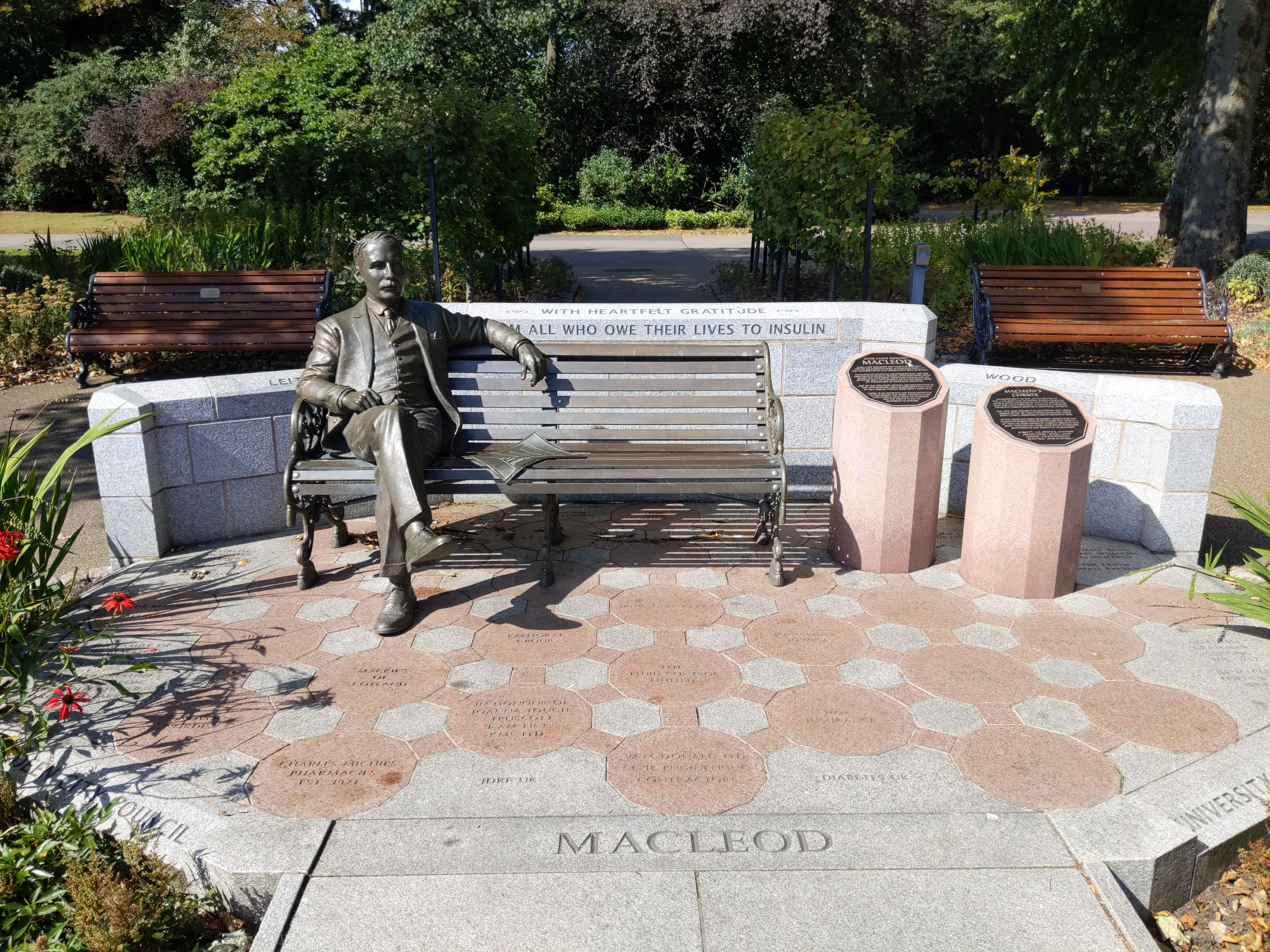
Statue of Macleod in Duthie Park, Aberdeen

John Macleod was a distinguished physiologist even before the discovery of insulin. He was elected a member of the Royal Society of Canada in 1919 and president of American Physiological Society in 1921. In 1923, Macleod was awarded the Cameron Prize for Therapeutics of the University of Edinburgh. Among the recognitions he received after 1923 were memberships of the Royal Society and the Royal Society of Edinburgh, corresponding membership of the German Academy of Sciences Leopoldina and honorary membership of the Regia Accademia Medica.

After Banting's death in a plane crash in 1941, Best, with the help of his friends, continued to spread Banting's account of the discovery and tried to "write out" Macleod and Collip from the history books. Only in 1950 was the first independent revision of all sides of the story made, and it gave credit to all four members of the team. However, Macleod's public image remained tainted for decades after that. The 1976 ITV television drama Comets Among the Stars, with Ralph Richardson in the Macleod role, portrayed him as dark and repulsive. The second dramatization of the discovery, Glory Enough for All (1988), at last portrayed him more objectively. By then it was commonly accepted that Banting's and Best's story was distorted, since more documentation had been made publicly available, and it made a precise reconstruction of the events possible. Until Best died, this documentation had been kept secret for over 50 years by the University of Toronto, whose administration wanted to avoid fueling the controversy.

Macleod's reputation in Canada remained under the influence of Banting and Best's story for decades, so Macleod was not esteemed there. His contribution to science is now recognized by the broad public, even in Canada. The auditorium of the Toronto University Medical Research Centre was named in his honour, as was Diabetes UK's award for patients who survive for 70 years with diabetes. In 2012, he was inducted into the Canadian Medical Hall of Fame.

=== Nobel Prize ===
Banting and Macleod's 1923 Nobel Prize for Physiology or Medicine (Diploma): "for the discovery of insulin"

The Nobel Committee reacted almost immediately to the first successful clinical trials. In the autumn of 1923, Banting and Macleod received the Nobel Prize in Physiology or Medicine, even though the long-term importance of the discovery was not yet apparent. They were nominated by the Danish physiologist and Nobel laureate August Krogh, who had a diabetic wife and had visited Macleod's laboratory and taken the method back to Denmark. Banting "had well-placed friends in Toronto" and "knowing that a Nobel Prize might well be awarded for insulin, they worked very hard to have Banting honoured, at home and abroad, as the discoverer of insulin". However, "among experienced scientists there was more support for the view that Banting and Best’s somewhat fumbling researches would not have reached the goal without the contributions of both Macleod and Collip". The committee judged that Macleod's work in interpreting the data, managing the clinical trials and providing a high level of public presentation were crucial for success, and "concluded that Banting would not have found the way to insulin without the guidance of Macleod", so they awarded the Nobel prize to both. Banting was furious, as he was convinced that Best should have received the other half, and he even thought of rejecting the prize. He was finally persuaded to accept it but gave half of his prize money to Best. Macleod in turn gave half of his to Collip. In 1972 the Nobel Foundation officially conceded that omitting Best was a mistake.

A second controversial aspect of the award was that eight months before Banting's and Best's paper, the Romanian physiologist Nicolae Paulescu had reported the discovery of a pancreas extract that he dubbed pancrein, which lowered blood glucose concentration. Banting and Best even cited him in their paper, but misinterpreted his findings, purportedly because of an error in translation from French. Best publicly apologized for that mistake many years later.

== See also ==
- List of Case Western people
