= Punta Gastaldi =

Mountain in the Cozie Alps, Italy

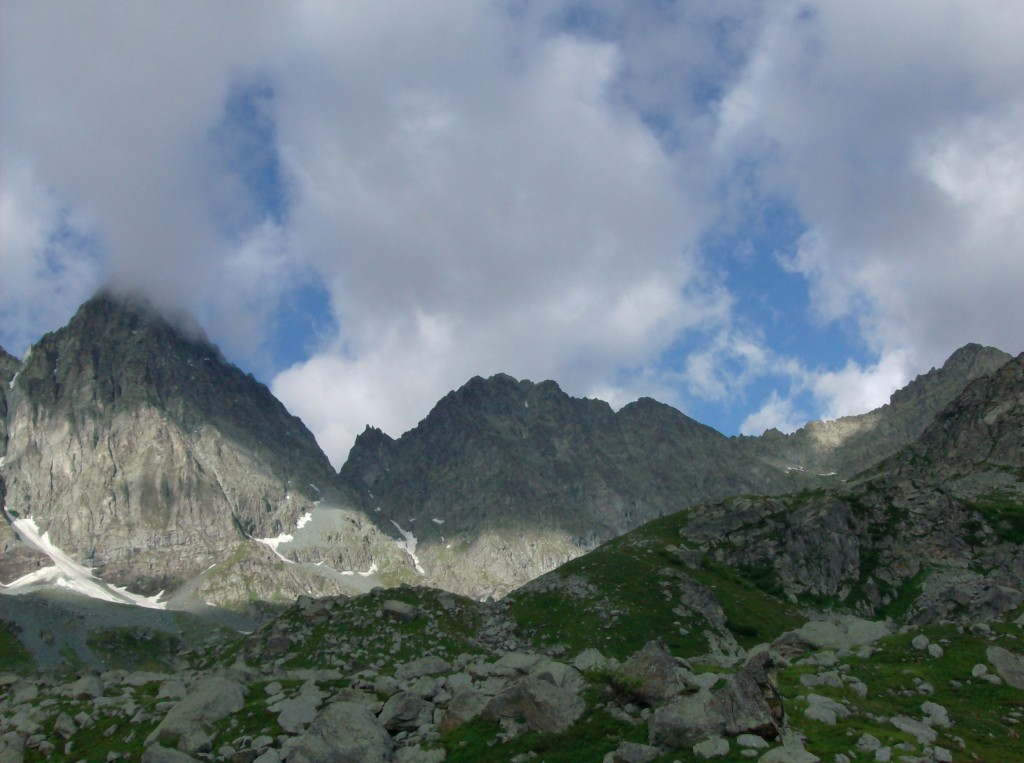
- The eastern slope of Punta Gastaldi seen from Vallone dei Quarti, near Lago Chiaretto

Highest point
- Prominence: 204 m (669 ft)
- Isolation: 0.61 km (0.38 mi)
- Coordinates: 44.680833°N 7.076389°E

Geography
- Country: Italy
- Region: Piedmont
- Parent range: Alps

Climbing
- First ascent: 16 August 1884

The Punta Gastaldi is a mountain in the Cottian Alps with an elevation of 3,214 m.

It is located on the northern ridge of the Monviso group, a short distance from the border between Italy and France; the summit lies entirely in Italian territory.

From Punta Gastaldi begins the Monviso ridge, which extends entirely in Italian territory.

== Characteristics ==
Punta Gastaldi lies at the intersection of three valleys:

- to the east, the Valle Po
- to the northwest, the Queyras
- to the southwest, the Vallone di Vallanta, a branch of the Valle Varaita

The state border with France, which follows the northern ridge of Monviso, diverges from this direction near Punta Gastaldi, turning sharply west to follow the ridge that, from the underlying Passo di Vallanta, reaches the Colle dell'Agnello. As a result, the summit is entirely in Italian territory.

The first ascent of the summit was made by Rev. William Auguste Coolidge and the guide Christian Almer Jr., who reached the summit via the normal route on 16 August 1884. The two, however, believed they had reached the Viso di Vallanta.

The peak was later dedicated to Bartolomeo Gastaldi, a geologist, mountain enthusiast, and co-founder with Quintino Sella of the Club Alpino Italiano.

From a geological perspective, the mountain, like the entire northern ridge of the Monviso group, belongs to the Piedmontese facies series of the Trias-Jura (Gastaldi’s greenstone zone): specifically, it is composed of effusive eruptive rocks (prasinites, amphibolite, eclogite).

== Access to the summit ==
=== Normal route ===
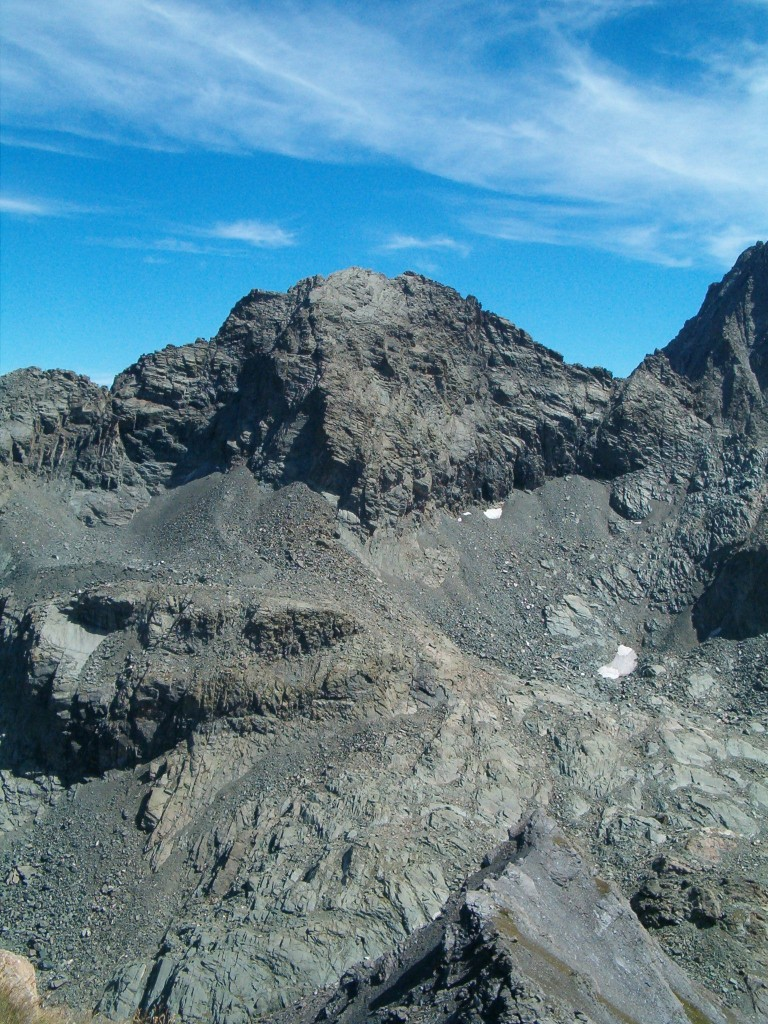
The western slope of Punta Gastaldi (normal route) seen from Monte Losetta.

The normal route to Punta Gastaldi follows the west-southwest ridge. It is a route with difficulty of II grade, variously assessed by different authors. The overall difficulty of the route is also assessed differently by various authors. The Guida dei Monti d'Italia rates it F+; Parodi rates it PD-; according to the climbers of the Villarfocchiardese Alpine Group (GAV), the overall difficulty is PD. It is, in any case, a route with alpine difficulties, requiring appropriate equipment (rope, carabiners, harness, helmet).

The route is reached from the Passo di Vallanta, ascending eastward over boulders and debris to the base of the walls that bound the summit dome to the west. A 50-meter open dihedral is climbed, with a consistent slope of about 60 degrees and continuous II-grade difficulty, until reaching the top of the WSW ridge, which is crossed with a II-II+ passage; from there, the summit is reached by following faint trails.

The Passo di Vallanta can be reached from Castello (Pontechianale) through the Vallone di Vallanta; from Chianale through the Vallone di Soustra and the Passo della Losetta; or from the Rifugio Viso in France. Support points include the aforementioned Rifugio Viso and, in Italy, the Rifugio Vallanta.

=== Other routes ===
It is possible to reach the summit by following the east and south-southeast ridges. This route, first climbed by Pompeo Viglino and the guide Claudio Perotti on 3 September 1907, has an overall difficulty rated as AD. It is a route that partially follows a snow gully, requiring an ice axe and crampons.

From the Valle Po, one ascends to the base of the snow gully descending from Passo Due Dita; it is climbed to a sloping meadow on the right, leading to the base of the east ridge. Climbing begins here, reaching the top of the ridge and following it, bypassing some pinnacles, until meeting the SSE ridge, which is ascended, also bypassing larger towers, until reaching the summit.

== See also ==
- Monviso
- Visolotto

== Bibliography ==
- Bruno, Michelangelo (1987). Monte Viso, Alpi Cozie Meridionali, Guida dei Monti d'Italia [Monte Viso, Southern Cozie Alps, Guide to the Mountains of Italy] (in Italian). Milan: Club Alpino Italiano e Touring Club Italiano.
