= Regius Professor of Physiology =

Regius Professor of Physiology is the title of a chair held at a two universities in Scotland. See:

- Regius Professor of Physiology (Aberdeen), for the University of Aberdeen
- Regius Professor of Physiology (Glasgow), for the University of Glasgow

== See also ==
- Regius Professor, for similar professorships
