= Bartolomeo Gastaldi =

Geologist and palaeontologist

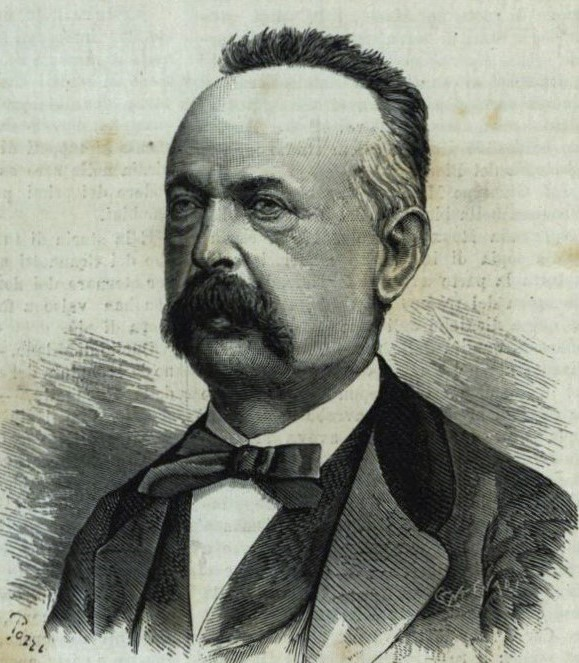
Bartolomeo Gastaldi.

Bartolomeo Gastaldi (10 February 1818 – 5 January 1879) was an Italian geologist and palæontologist, and one of the founders of the Club Alpino Italiano.

Gastaldi was born in Turin, then capital of the Kingdom of Sardinia. As a child he developed a passion for fossils; the finds he made during excursions in the areas around Turin and Asti were to form the basis for his extensive collection of fossils and geological specimens. Under pressure from his father he studied law at the University of Turin, Faculty of Law; after graduating in 1839 he entered the legal profession.

On the death of his father in 1843 he abandoned his legal work and devoted his energies to geology and palaeontology, making field trips in various parts of Italy and in Spain. He spent the years 1849–52 in Paris taking courses at the Ecole des Mines, the Jardin des Plantes, the Collège de France and the Sorbonne. A particular interest was glaciology. Also at this time he first met Quintino Sella with whom he was to form a lasting friendship.

He became professor of mineralogy and geology at the University of Turin.

On 23 October 1863, together with Quintino Sella and others, he founded the Club Alpino Italiano, the first and largest Italian Alpine Club, becoming its first vice-president. The following year he was appointed as its second president, an office he held until 1872.

In 1870, he was made a member of the Accademia nazionale delle scienze.

Bartolomeo Gastaldi died in Turin in 1879.

== Recognitions ==
The mineral gastaldite, a type of glaucophane, is named after him; so too are the Rifugio Bartolomeo Gastaldi (a mountain hut in the Graian Alps), the mountain called Cresta Gastaldi in the Gran Paradiso group, and the Punta Gastaldi, a peak near Monviso.
