= William Stirling (physiologist) =

Scottish physiologist (1851–1932)

William Stirling MD LLD DSc FRSE (26 January 1851, in Grangemouth – 1 October 1932, in Manchester), was a Scottish physiologist. He served as professor of physiology and was a founder of the physiology department at the Victoria University of Manchester.

== Life ==
He was born in Grangemouth on 26 January 1851.

He was educated at Dollar Academy, then studied science and medicine at the University of Edinburgh, graduating with a BSc with first class honours in 1870, DSc and MB CM both with similar distinction in 1872 and MD with gold medal in 1875. He then studied at the University of Leipzig under Professor Carl Ludwig, and at Paris under Professor Louis-Antoine Ranvier. Stirling was appointed demonstrator of zoology and, later, of physiology at the University of Edinburgh. In 1877 he became Regius Professor of the Institutes of Medicine in the University of Aberdeen. His classroom was in Marischal College, but by then King's and Marischal Colleges had been united into one university. In the same year he was elected a Fellow of the Royal Society of Edinburgh. His proposers were Sir Joseph Lister, Sir William Turner, John Hutton Balfour and William Rutherford. His predecessor's practical course had been limited to microscopic histology. Stirling introduced demonstrations of experimental physiology.

Stirling was, upon the resignation of Arthur Gamgee, appointed the Brackenbury Professor of Physiology and Histology at Owens College (in 1904 renamed the Victoria University of Manchester) from 1886 until his retirement in 1919. In the Brackenbury Professorship, he was succeeded by A. V. Hill.

Stirling was in 1902–1913 dean of the medical school of Owens College (renamed Victoria University of Manchester in 1904) and gave many public lectures on medicine and public health. After he became a professor at the University of Aberdeen he no longer did scientific research and concentrated on teaching, administration, and writing. His BMJ obituary notes that he was a fine lecturer for medical students and the general public, in that he was clear, precise and didactic: there was little weighing of arguments for and against physiological theories and certainly not much philosophical doubt.

He translated Leonard Landois's Lehrbuch der Physiologie des Menschen in 1884, adding some chapters of his own, including a detailed account of the examination of the chest and heart. He also wrote Outlines of Practical Physiology (1888) and Outlines of Practical Histology (1890). Stirling was in 1906–1909 Fullerian Professor of Physiology of the Royal Institution, London. He was a fellow of the Royal Society of Edinburgh and was elected in 1877 a member of the Physiological Society.

A collection of his papers is held by the University of Manchester Library.

== Family ==
His son, William Stirling, became an ophthalmic surgeon in Manchester.

== Works (selection) ==
- A Manual of Human Physiology
- A text-book of practical histology, 1881
- Outlines of practical physiology: being a manual for the physiological laboratory, including chemical and experimental physiology, with reference to practical medicine, 1895
- Some apostles of physiology : being an account of their lives and labours, labours that have contributed to the advancement of the healing art as well as to the prevention of disease. With Frederick Grant Banting, private printing, 1902

Academic offices
Preceded by Louis Compton Miall	Fullerian Professor of Physiology; 1906–1909	Succeeded by Frederick Walker Mott
