= Regius Professor of Physiology (Aberdeen) =

Regius Professorship of Physiology is a Regius Chair at the University of Aberdeen. It was originally called the Regius Chair of the Institutes of Medicine.

== List of Regius Professors of Physiology ==
- 1877 to 1886: William Stirling
- 1886 to 1928: John Alexander MacWilliam
- 1928 to 1935: John Macleod
- Cecil Kidd
- 1977 to 1983: Derek Ogston
- 2002 to 2022: Colin McCaig
- 2024 to present: Mirela Delibegovic
