= Chemism =

Chemism refers to forces of attraction or adhesion between entities. It has uses in chemistry and philosophy.

== Chemistry ==
In the past, chemism referred to intramolecular forces between atoms, or more generally, any forces acting on atoms and molecules. It is now typically superseded by more precise terms such as hydrogen interaction.

== Philosophy ==
The concept of chemism has been referred to in many of the various disciplines that constitute philosophical practice.

The use of the term in philosophy references the activities of chemism in chemistry.

Chemism is a term in Hegelian philosophy that stands for the "mutual attraction, interpenetration, and neutralisation of independent individuals which unite to form a whole." Hegel posits that the concept of "Objectivity" contains the "three forms of Mechanism, Chemism, and Teleology":

"The object of mechanical type is the immediate and undifferentiated object. No doubt it contains difference, but the different pieces stand, as it were, without affinity to each other, and their connection is only extraneous. In chemism, on the contrary, the object exhibits an essential tendency to differentiation, in such a way that the objects are what they are only by their relation to each other: this tendency to difference constitutes their quality. The third type of objectivity, the teleological relation, is the unity of mechanism and chemism. Design, like the mechanical object, is a self-contained totality, enriched however by the principle of differentiation which came to the fore in chemism, and thus referring itself to the object that stands over against it. Finally, it is the realisation of design which forms the transition to the Idea."

In his Science of Logic, Georg Wilhelm Friedrich Hegel develops a succession of different forms of mechanism, which end up engendering a process called "chemism". Chemism is obviously a term that lends itself to chemical relationships in physical reality. Hegel, however, is using the term "chemism" logically, and therefore it can be applied to things that you do not study in chemistry class but you might study in German literature, reading Goethe's Elective Affinities, or in psychological studies dealing with a chemistry between individuals:

"Chemism constitutes in objectivity as a whole, the moment of judgment, of the difference that has become objective, and of the process. Since it already begins with determinateness and positedness and the chemical object is at the same time an objective totality, its immediate course is simple and is completely determined by its presupposition."
