= Pontechianale =

- Comune
- Comune di Pontechianale
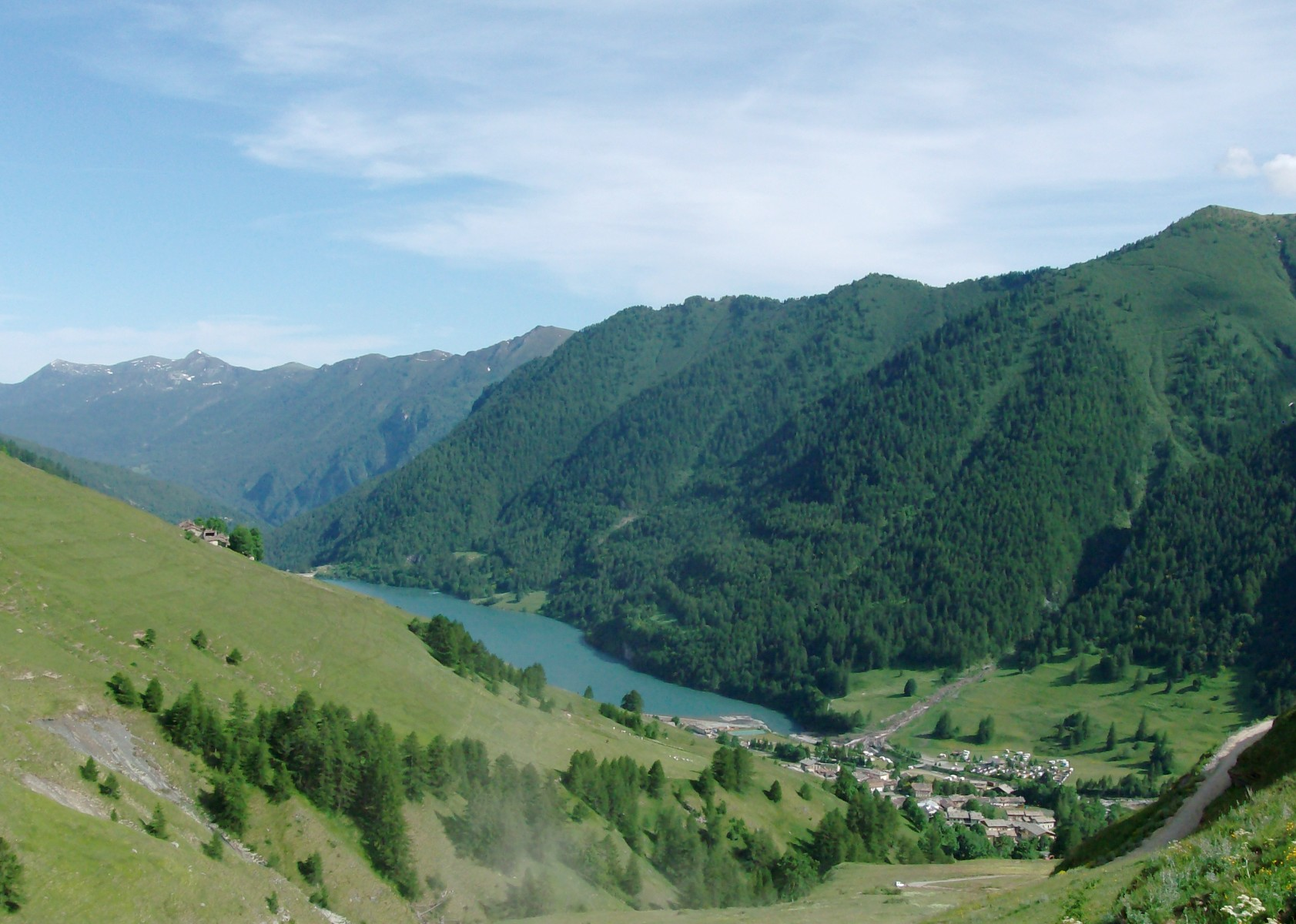
- View of the frazione of Maddalena in Pontechianale

- Location within Italy Location within Piedmont
- Coordinates: 44°37′N 7°2′E
- Country: Italy
- Region: Piedmont
- Province: Cuneo (CN)
- Frazioni: Maddalena (communal capital), Castello, Villaretto, Rueite, Genzana, Forest, Chianale

Government
  - Mayor: Oliviero Patrile

Area
  - Total: 94.92 km^{2} (36.65 sq mi)
- Elevation: 1,614 m (5,295 ft)

Population (31 August 2017)
  - Total: 167
  - Density: 1.76/km^{2} (4.56/sq mi)
- Demonym: Pontechianalesi
- Time zone: UTC+1 (CET)
  - Summer (DST): UTC+2 (CEST)
- Postal code: 12020
- Dialing code: 0175

Pontechianale is a comune (municipality) in the Province of Cuneo in the Italian region Piedmont, located about 70 kilometres (43 mi) southwest of Turin and about 50 kilometres (31 mi) northwest of Cuneo, on the border with France.

Pontechianale borders the following municipalities: Bellino, Casteldelfino, Crissolo, Oncino (Italy), Molines-en-Queyras, Ristolas, Saint-Paul-sur-Ubaye, and Saint-Véran (France). Its frazione of Chianale is one of I Borghi più belli d'Italia ("The most beautiful villages of Italy").

== See also ==
- Monte Ferra
- Punta Tre Chiosis
