= Monte Viso =

Mountain in Italy

- Monviso
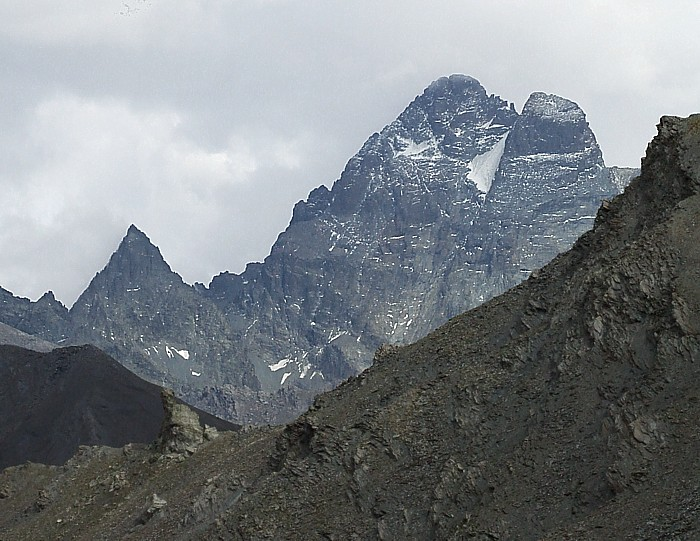
- Monviso seen from the Col de Chamoussiere (FR).

Highest point
- Elevation: 3,841 m (12,602 ft)
- Prominence: 2,062 m (6,765 ft); Ranked 10th in the Alps
- Listing: Ultra; Alpine mountains above 3000 m
- Coordinates: 44°40′03″N 07°05′30″E

Naming
- Native name: Vísol (Occitan); Viso (Piedmontese)

Geography
- Location within Alps
- Location: Piedmont, Italy
- Parent range: Cottian Alps

Climbing
- First ascent: August 30, 1861 by William Mathews and Frederic Jacomb with guide Michel Croz
- Easiest route: South Face scramble

Monte Viso (Note: This form of the name is now rare in Italian.) or Monviso (Italian: [moɱˈviːzo]; Occitan: Vísol [ˈvizul]; Piedmontese: Brich ëd Viso [ˈbrik əd ˈvizʊ] or simply Viso) is the highest mountain of the Cottian Alps, located in Piedmont, Italy, close to the French border. Monte Viso is well known for its pyramid-like shape. Because it is higher than all its neighbouring peaks by about 500 m, it can be seen from a great distance, including from the Piedmontese plateau, the Langhe, the Theodulpass in the Zermatt ski area, the Col du Galibier and the summits of the Mont Blanc massif. On a very clear day, it can be seen from the spires of Milan Cathedral.

It has been suggested that Monte Viso could be one of the mountains which inspired the Paramount logo, even though the company has denied the claims. In Italy it is also known as il Re di Pietra ("the Stone King") because of its prominence within the western Italian Alps. It was declared a cross-border UNESCO biosphere reserve in 2013. The longest river of Italy, River Po, is born at the mountain's foot.

== Geography ==
On the northern slopes of Monte Viso are the headwaters of the Po, the longest Italian river, the so-called Pian del Re (2,020 m). The Monviso group is surrounded by the Valle Po, Valle Varaita and, on the French side, the Guil valley. The northern sector of the group, from the Punta Gastaldi to the Col de la Traversette, is located on the French border.

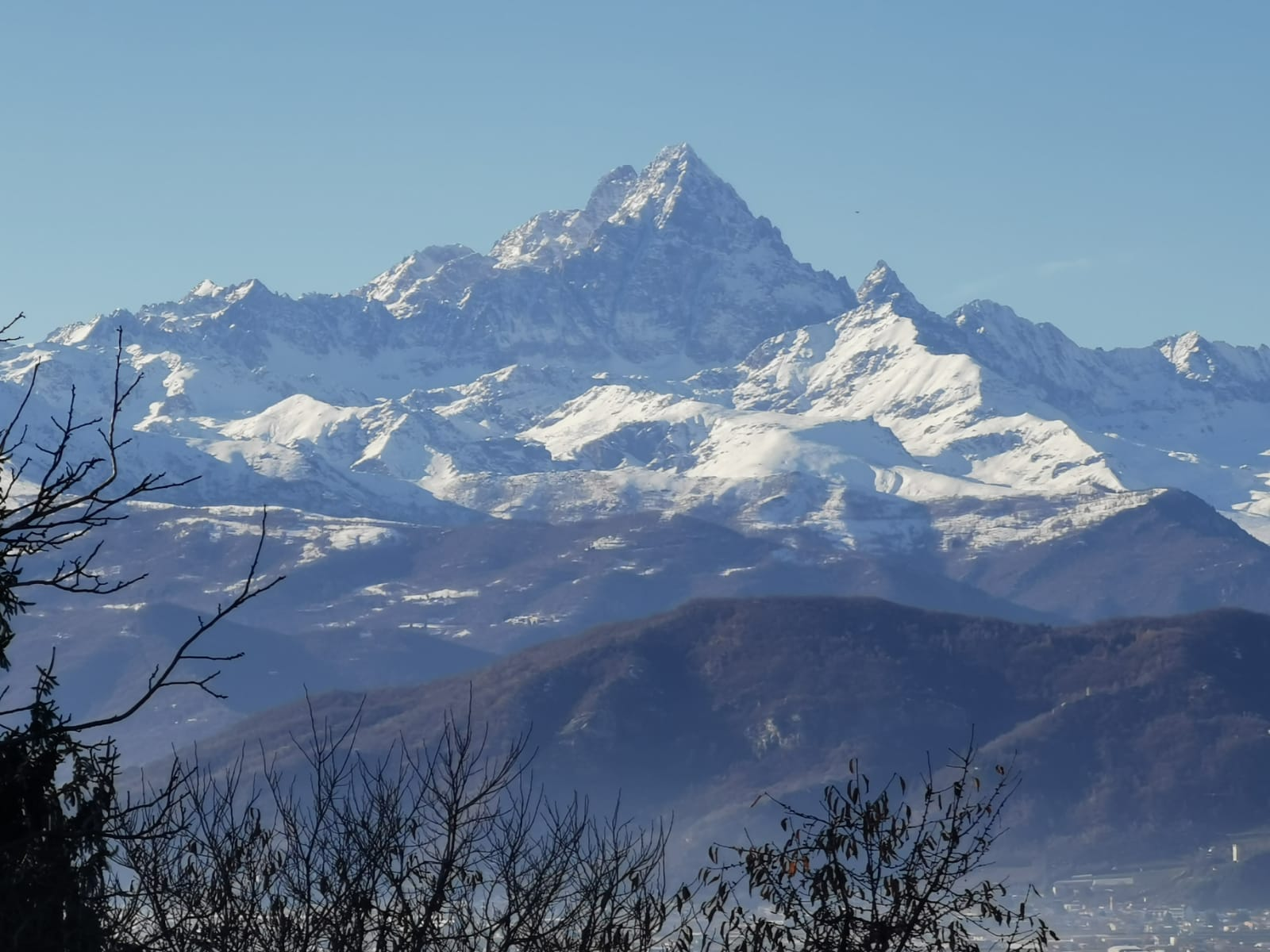
Monte Viso as seen from outside Saluzzo

=== SOIUSA classification ===
According to the SOIUSA (International Standardized Mountain Subdivision of the Alps) the mountain can be classified in the following way:

- main part = Western Alps
- major sector = South Western Alps
- section = Cottian Alps
- subsection = southern Cottian Alps
- supergroup = catena Aiguillette-Monviso-Granero
- group = gruppo del Monviso isa
- subgroup = nodo del Monviso
- code = I/A-4.I-C.8.a

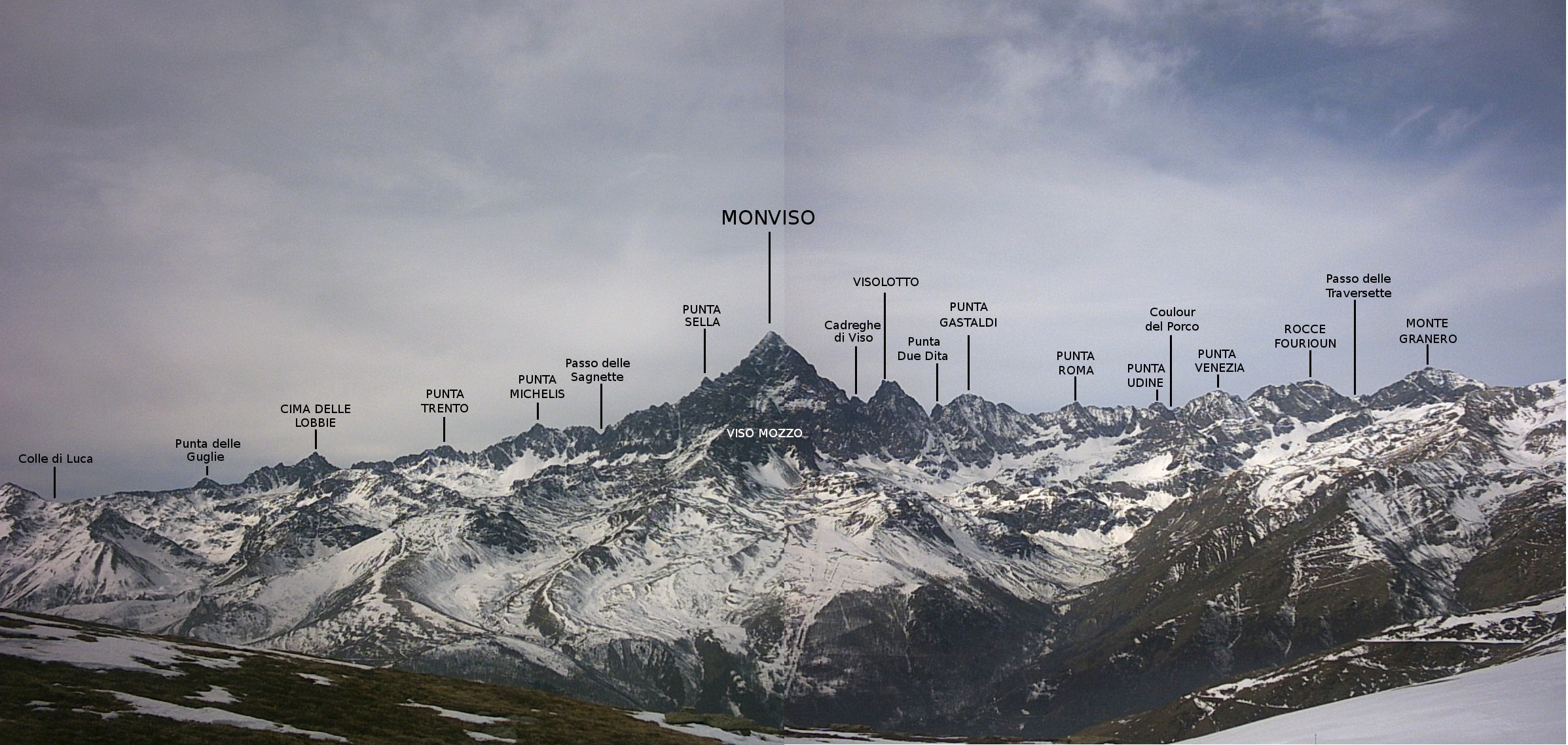
Panoramic view of Monviso with the main peaks

== History ==
Monte Viso is the location of a Neolithic jadeite quarry, at an elevation of 2,000 to 2,400 metres. Its productivity peaked around 5000 BC. The jadeite was used to make cult axes, which are found all over western Europe. One such ceremonial axe head was found as far away as a small hill called Tristia in Western Ireland and is on display in the National Museum of Ireland – Archaeology, Dublin.

In ancient times the mountain was known as Vesulus.

Monte Viso was climbed for the first time on August 30, 1861 by William Mathews, Frederick Jacomb, Jean-Baptiste Croz and Michel Croz. The first woman to summit the mountain was Alessandra Boarelli (1838–1908) on 16 August 1864.

== Monte Viso in literature ==
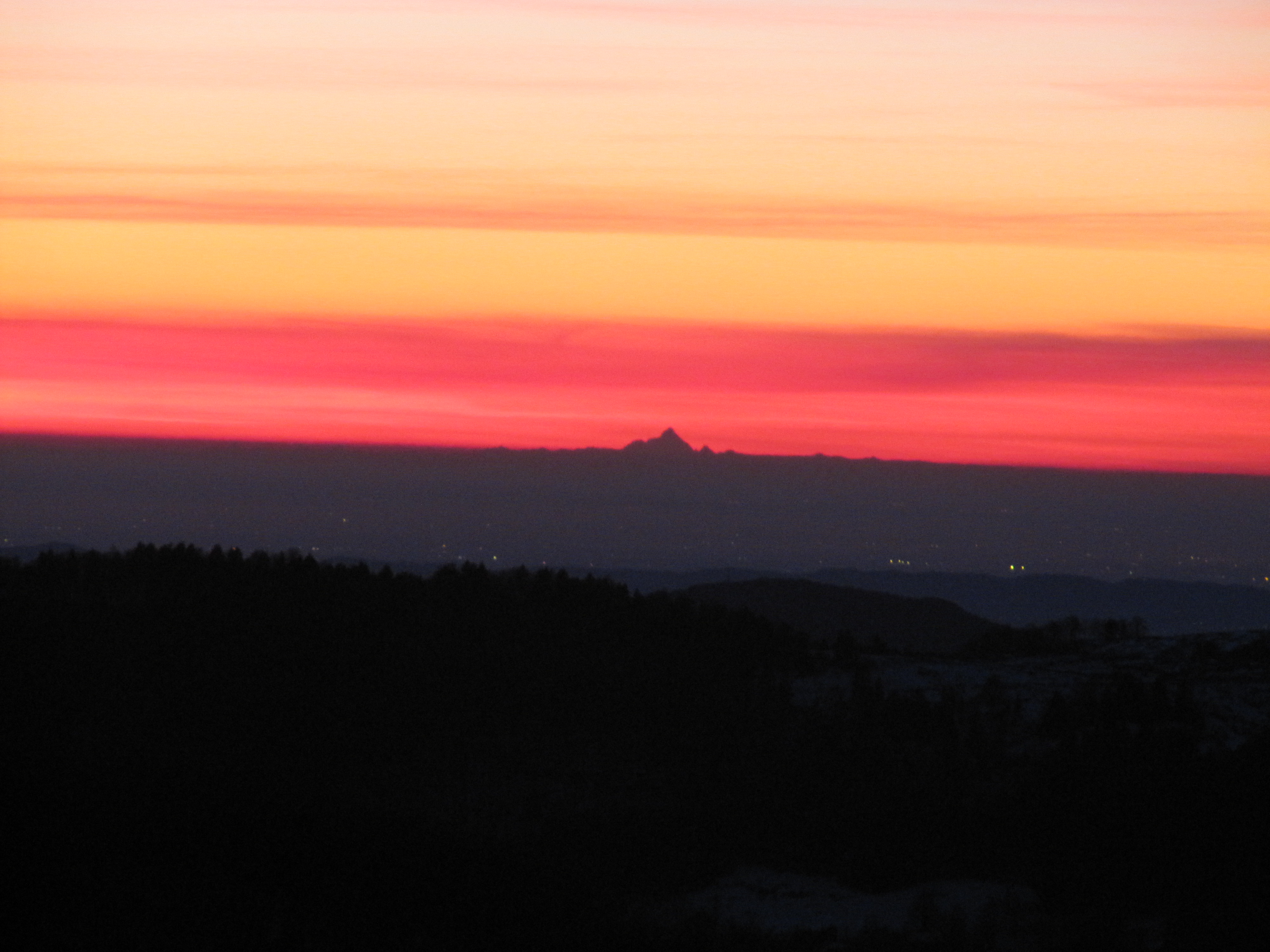
Sunset view of Monviso from San Giorgio della Lessinia (VR), over 300km away.

Monte Viso is mentioned by various authors, Italian and non-, including Dante, Petrarch, and Chaucer. Dante mentions the mountain in a long simile in Canto XVI of the Inferno as the source of the Montone River:

Come quel fiume c'ha proprio cammino
prima dal Monte Viso 'nver' levante,
da la sinistra costa d'Apennino

Chaucer cites the mountain in the prologue to the Clerk's Tale in his Canterbury Tales, in a passage adapted from Petrarch's Latin version of his "Tale of Griselda":

A prohemie, in which discryveth he,
Pemond, and of Saluces the contree,
And speketh of Appenyn, the hilles hye,
That been the boundes of West Lumbardye,
And of Mount Vesulus in special,
Wher as the Poo out of a welle smal,
Taketh his first spryngyng and his cours
That eastward ay encresseth in his cours
To Emele-ward, to Ferare and Venyse;
The which a long thyng were to devyse.

(Geoffrey Chaucer, "The Clerk's Tale," from The Canterbury Tales)

== See also ==
- List of Alpine peaks by prominence
- List of mountains of the Alps above 3000 m
- Monte Viso tunnel

== Bibliography ==
- McLewin, Will (1991). In Monte Viso's Horizon: Climbing All the Alpine 4000m Peaks. Ernest Press. ISBN 0-948153-09-1.
