= Monte Oronaye =

Mountain on the Italy-France border in the Alpi Cozie

- Tête de Moïse
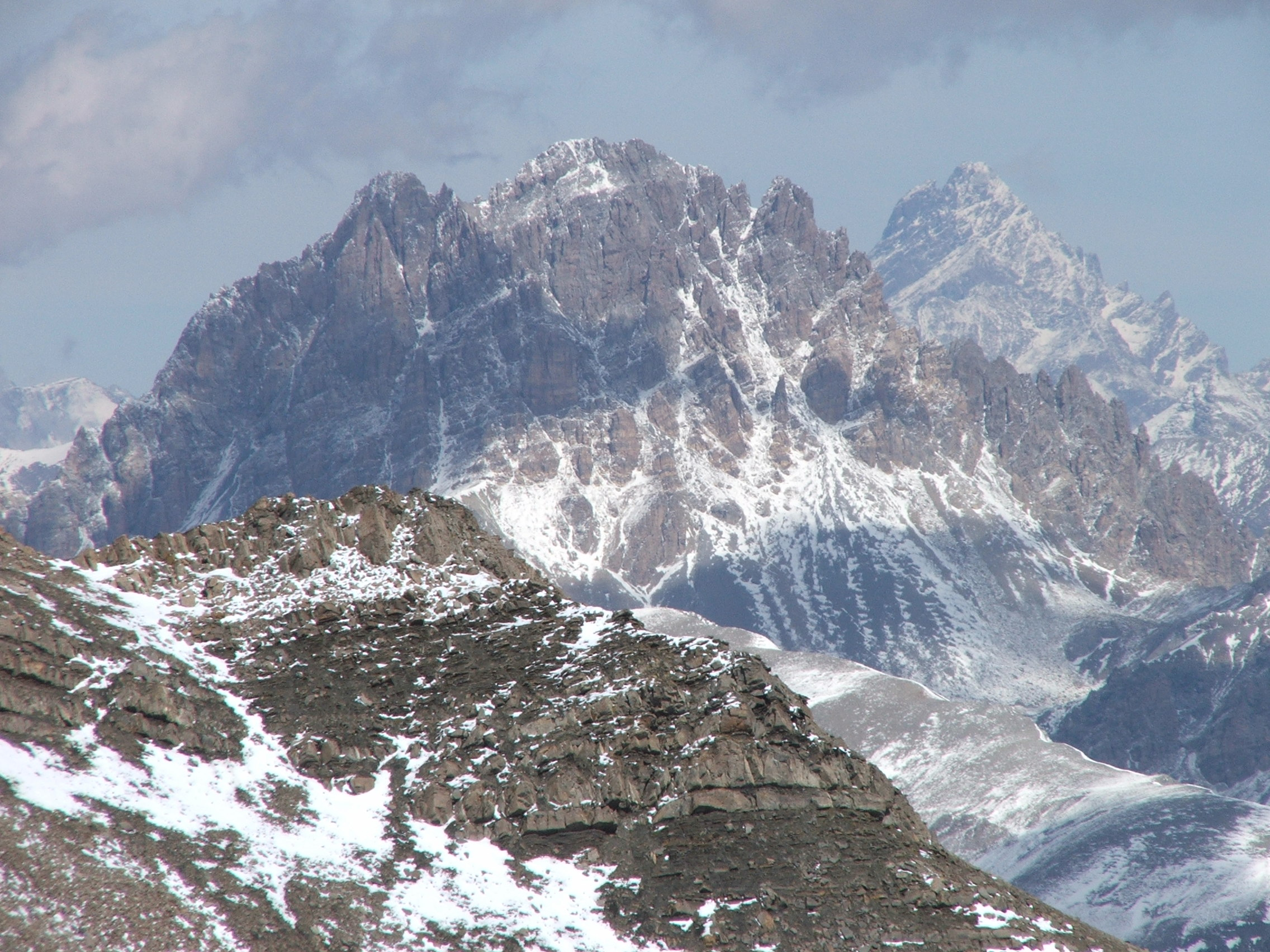
- Monte Oronaye seen from Rocca dei Tre Vescovi, with Monviso on the right

Highest point
- Elevation: 3,104 m (10,184 ft)
- Prominence: 577 m (1,893 ft)
- Isolation: 11.7 km (7.3 mi)
- Coordinates: 44°26′29″N 6°56′02″E

Naming
- Language of name: French

Geography
- Countries: Italy; France
- Region(s): Piedmont; Provence-Alpes-Côte d'Azur
- Parent range: Alps

Climbing
- First ascent: August 1883

The Monte Oronaye (Tête de Moïse in French) is a mountain of 3,104 metres in the Alpi Cozie, located along the border between Italy and France. It also lies on the watershed between the Valle Maira and the Valle dell'Ubayette, in French territory.

== Description ==
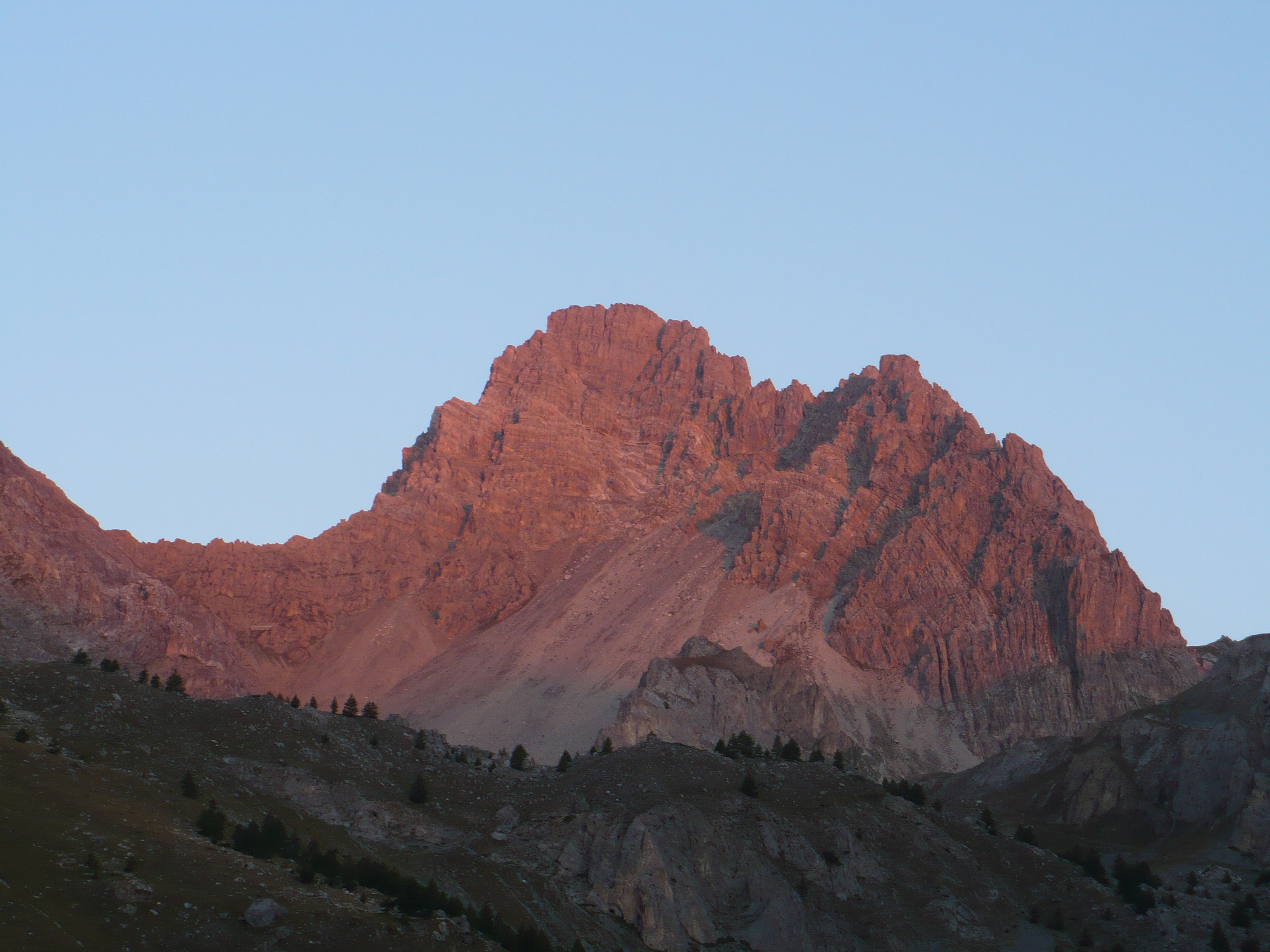
View of Monte Oronaye from the Enchiausa valley in upper Valle Maira at first light.

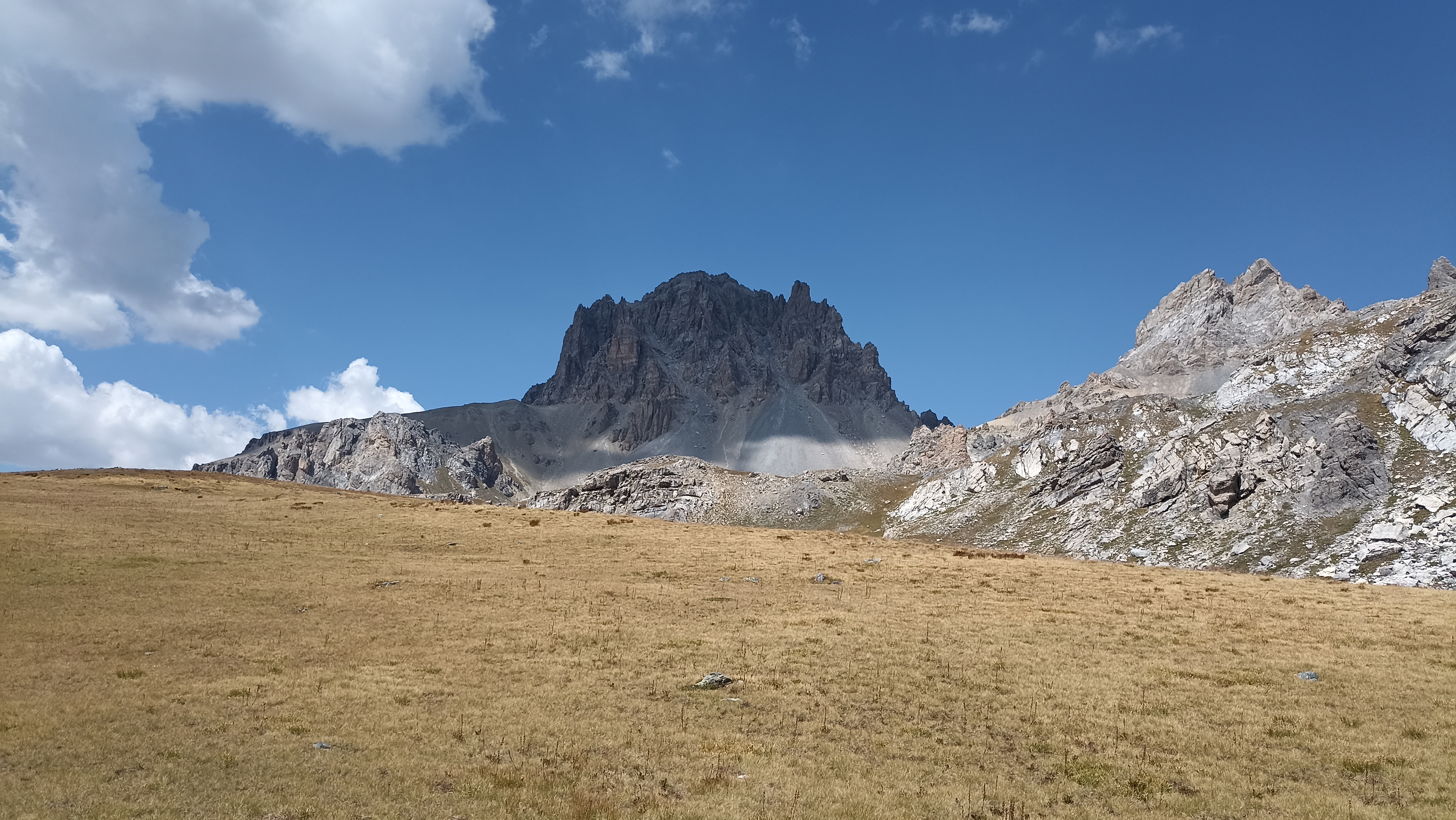
The mountain seen from the Colle di Roburent.

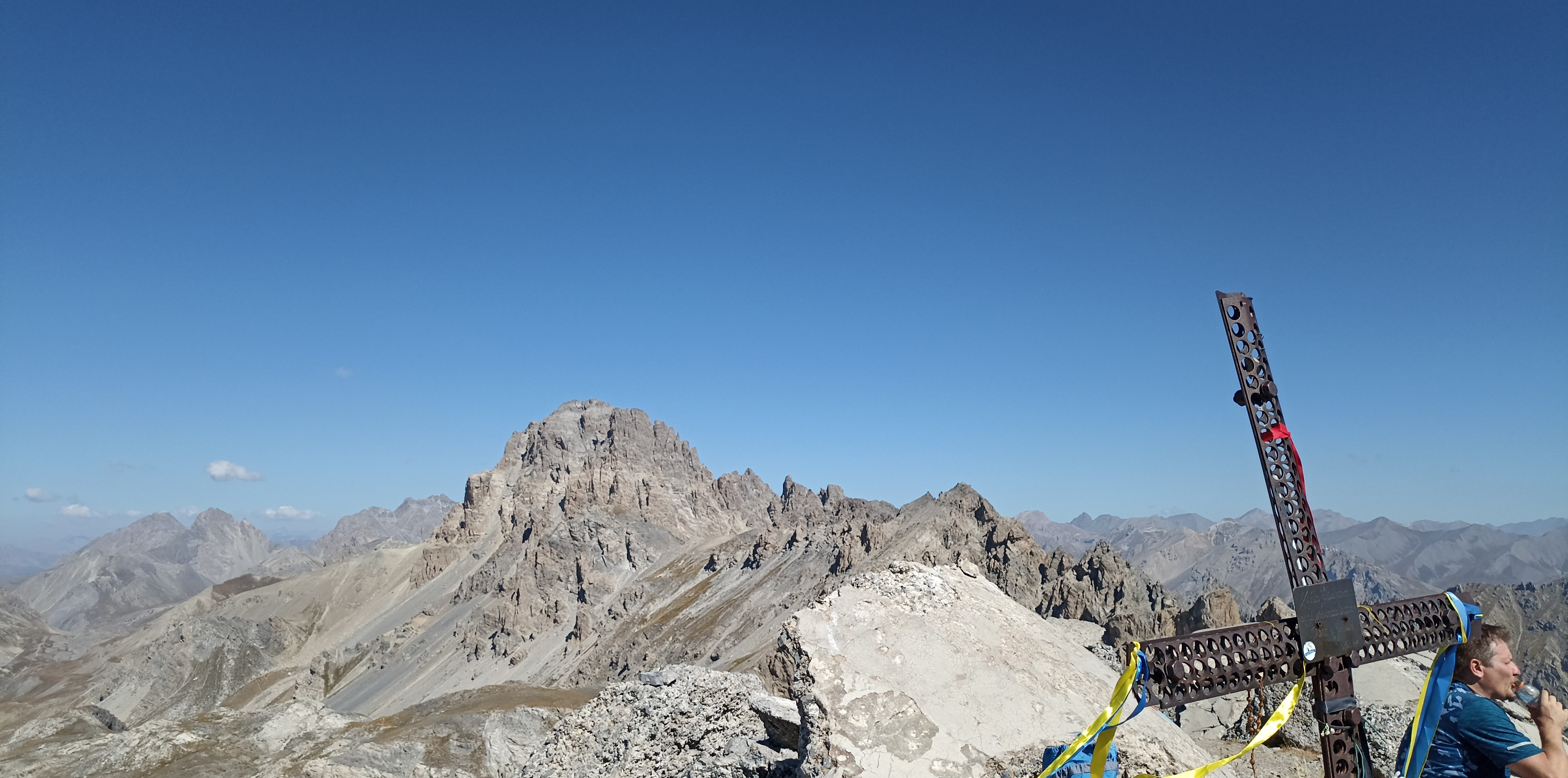
The mountain seen from the summit of Monte Scaletta.

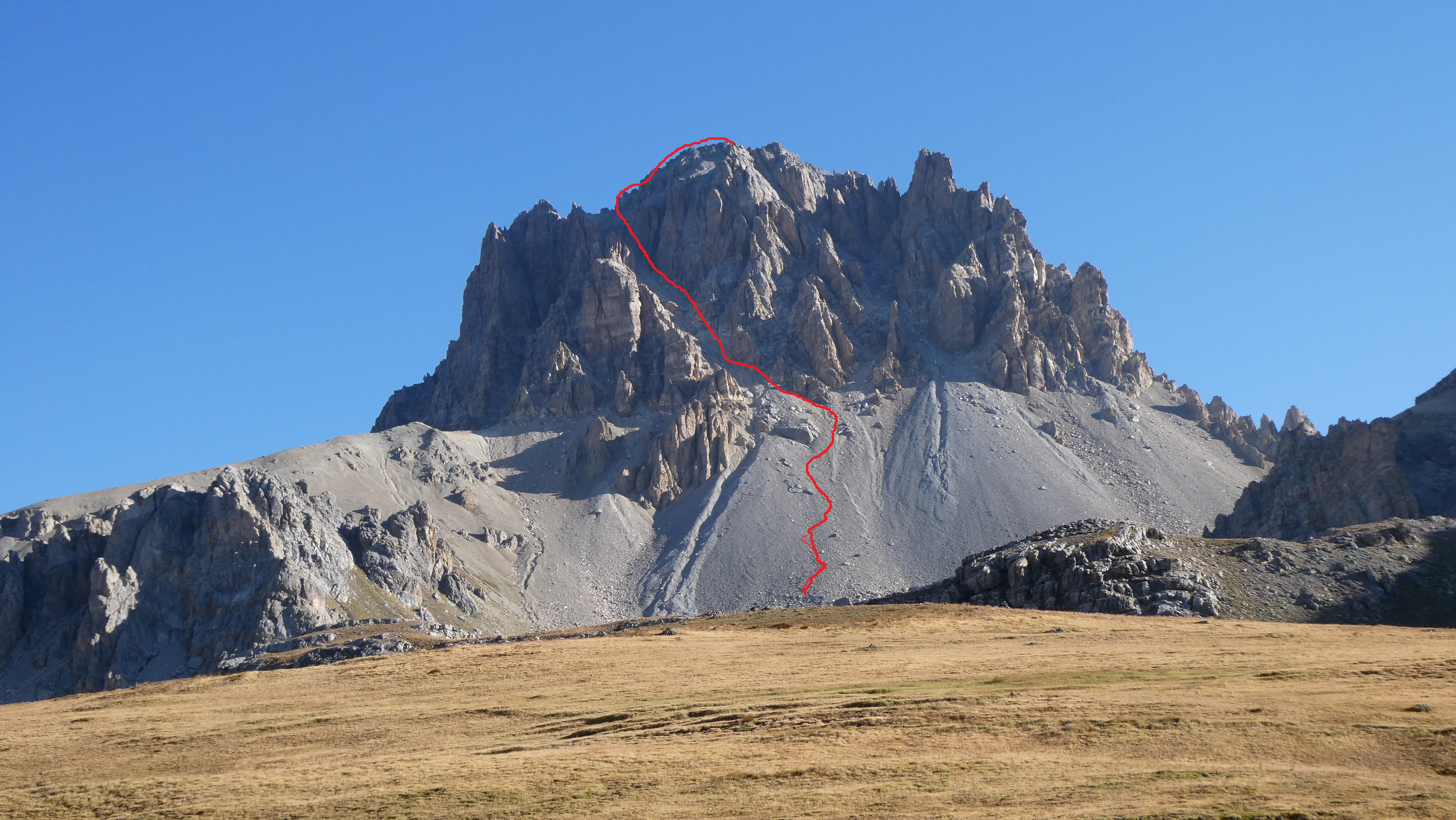
The mountain seen from Colle Roburent with the normal ascent route marked.

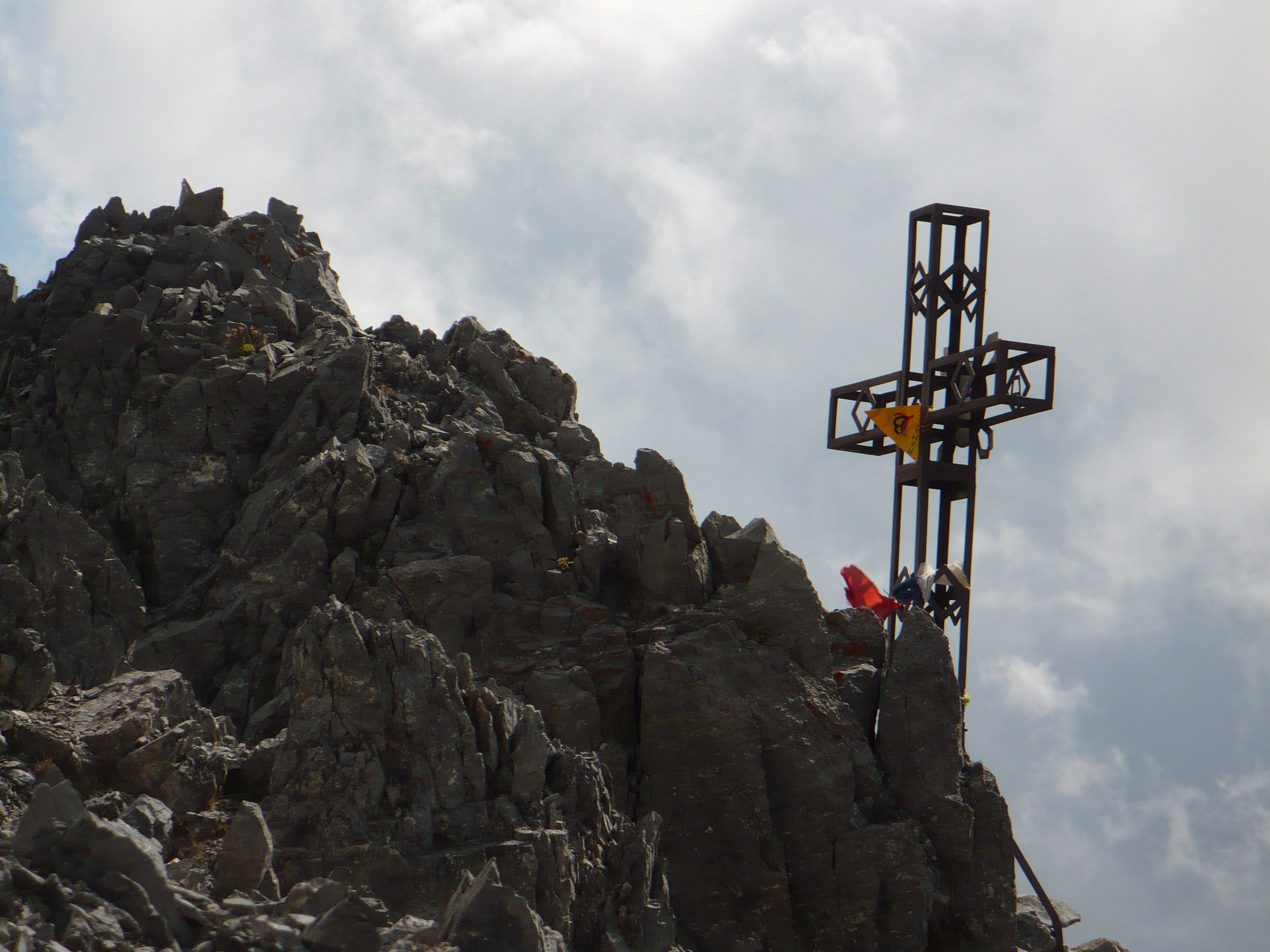
The summit cross

The Oronaye is the first massif of the Alpi Cozie encountered when traversing them from the south, starting from the Colle della Maddalena.

It lies on the main Alpine watershed, on the border between the Vallée de l'Ubaye in France and the Valle Maira in Italy. On the Italian side, it administratively belongs to the Province of Cuneo; on the French side, it belongs to the department of Alpes-de-Haute-Provence. It appears as a massive limestone protrusion on the main ridge, with steep flanks in all directions.

From a geological perspective, the mountain is composed of dolomitic limestone from the Middle Triassic, resting on a base of fractured marbles and black flysch. The rock is notably friable; alpinistic activity therefore preferentially requires the use of a helmet.

== Ascent ==
The normal route involves ascending from the trail starting at Colle della Maddalena, located at the top of the Valle Stura (CN). The trail begins near a spring on the north side of the road on the French side of the pass. It follows the course of the Oronaye stream and continues along the valley until reaching the Lake Oronaye. After the lake, the trail continues to the left, skirting a ridge until reaching a gully below which lies a distinctive diamond-shaped boulder. The gully is ascended, which is very strenuous due to the steepness and unstable detrital terrain. After passing the diamond-shaped boulder, one stays close to the rocky wall where red markers are present. Upon reaching the notch at the top of the gully, the route continues to the right through a series of well-gripped rocky channels (II and III degree) and finally emerges onto the ridge, leading via a trail to the summit and the large metal cross. The complete route involves an elevation gain of about 1,100 m; the difficulty rating of the route, which is alpinistic, is classified as F.

Another ascent route starts from the Valle Maira, specifically from the locality Viviere (1,713 m), just above Pratorotondo (1,629 m), a hamlet of Acceglio. From Viviere, one must traverse the Enchiausa valley until reaching the Bivacco Enrico e Mario (2,650 m) and the Colle Feuillas (2,749 m). From here, one descends into French territory (Vallée de l'Ubaye) and ascends the same gravelly gully reached from the Colle della Maddalena. In this case, the ascent involves an elevation gain of over 1,400 metres; the difficulty rating is assessed as F+.

=== Winter access ===
For winter summit access, the approach can be made with skis or snowshoes, starting from the Colle della Maddalena, followed by ascending the final channel with ice axe and crampons.

== Via Ferrata degli Alpini ==
The Via Ferrata degli Alpini was constructed in the 1930s by the Alpini of the Battaglione Dronero for military observation purposes. Restored between 2010 and 2012, the Ferrata is accessible from the Valle Maira, from the hamlet of Viviere in Acceglio, following the summit access route up to the Bivacco Enrico e Mario (2,650 m). Turning right toward the Oronaye, on a steep slope, one follows the clear path that ascends through scree toward the northeast ridge (anchors in place). The Ferrata itself is characterized by two parallel cables: one from the 1930s with wooden grips incorporated for better handholds, and a safety cable for securing; the final section, reaching Cima Dronero (3,050 m), consists of a long iron ladder.

The Ferrata does not reach the true summit of Oronaye; from Cima Dronero, the route is alpinistic with difficulties up to IV on unstable rock. From the end of the Ferrata, to reach the summit, one must continue a few meters with a cable and anchors in place, perform a rappel of about 7–10 m, ascend a rock slab, and proceed along the ridge to the peak. The route is equipped with anchor points. The difficulties are not high, but great care must be taken due to unstable rocks.

== Bibliography ==
- "Boncko.it - Anello Oronaye Chambeyron" [Oronaye Chambeyron Loop]. Boncko.it (in Italian). Archived from the original on 25 December 2010.

=== Cartography ===
- Official cartography of the Istituto Geografico Militare at scales 1:25,000 and 1:100,000, available online
- Sistema Informativo Territoriale della provincia di Cuneo, based on 1:10,000 cartography
- Istituto Geografico Centrale - Trail map 1:50,000 no. 7 "Valli Maira, Grana e Stura"
