= Argentera =

Argentera L'Argentiera
- Comune
- Comune di Argentera
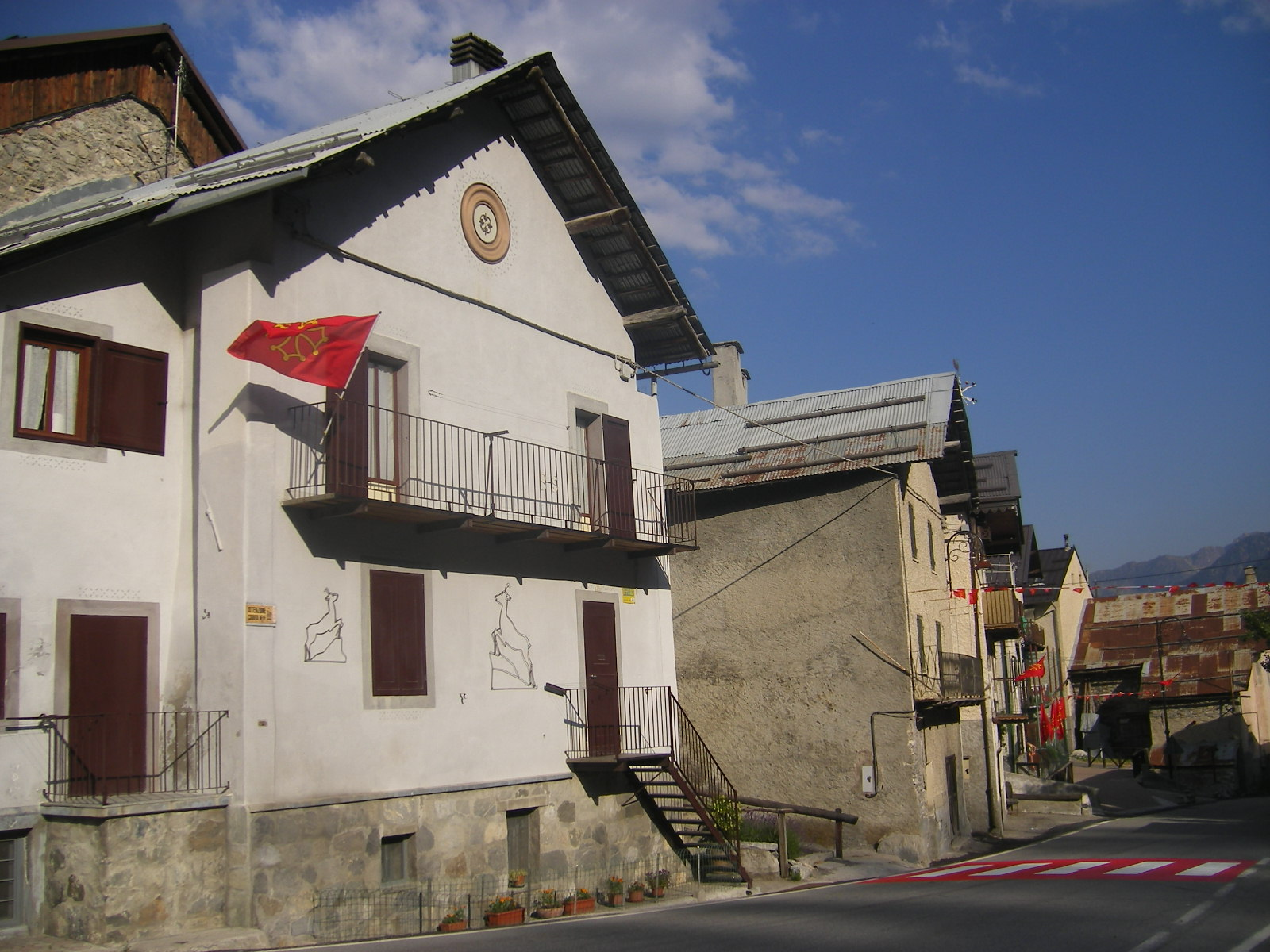
- View of Bersezio

- Coat of arms

- Location of Argentera in Italy Argentera (Piedmont)
- Coordinates: 44°24′N 6°56′E
- Country: Italy
- Region: Piedmont
- Province: Cuneo (CN)
- Frazioni: Bersezio (municipal seat), Ferrere, Le Grange and Severagno (ruinied boroughs), Villaggio Primavera, Prinardo, Serre

Government
  - Mayor: Monica Ciaburro

Area
  - Total: 77.7 km^{2} (30.0 sq mi)
- Elevation: 1,684 m (5,525 ft)

Population (30 April 2017)
  - Total: 78
  - Density: 1.0/km^{2} (2.6/sq mi)
- Demonym: Argentesi or Argenters
- Time zone: UTC+1 (CET)
  - Summer (DST): UTC+2 (CEST)
- Postal code: 12010
- Dialing code: 0171

Argentera is a comune (municipality) in the Province of Cuneo in the Italian region Piedmont, located about 100 kilometres (62 mi) southwest of Turin and about 60 kilometres (37 mi) west of Cuneo, on the border with France. It consists of a series of sparse hamlets in the upper Valle Stura di Demonte. The municipal seat is in Bersezio, on the road to the Maddalena Pass.

Argentera borders the following municipalities: Acceglio, Canosio, Larche (France), Pietraporzio, and Saint-Etienne-de-Tinée (France). Its territory includes peaks such as the Monte Oserot at an elevation of 2,860 metres (9,380 ft) above sea level, Enciastraia at 2,955 metres (9,695 ft) and the Rocca dei Tre Vescovi at 2,867 metres (9,406 ft).
