= Canosio =

- Comune
- Comune di Canosio
- Coat of arms

- Location within Italy Location within Piedmont
- Coordinates: 44°27′N 7°5′E
- Country: Italy
- Region: Piedmont
- Province: Cuneo (CN)
- Frazioni: Preit

Government
  - Mayor: Roberto Colombero

Area
  - Total: 48.9 km^{2} (18.9 sq mi)
- Elevation: 1,323 m (4,341 ft)

Population (30 April 2017)
  - Total: 80
  - Density: 1.6/km^{2} (4.2/sq mi)
- Demonym: Canosiani
- Time zone: UTC+1 (CET)
  - Summer (DST): UTC+2 (CEST)
- Postal code: 12020
- Dialing code: 0171
- Patron saint: St. Lucy
- Saint day: December 13
- Website: Official website

Canosio is a small comune (municipality) in the Province of Cuneo in the Italian region Piedmont, located about 80 kilometres (50 mi) southwest of Turin and about 40 kilometres (25 mi) west of Cuneo.

Canosio borders the following municipalities: Acceglio, Argentera, Marmora, Pietraporzio, Prazzo, and Sambuco.

== See also ==
- Rocca la Meja
