= Marmora, Piedmont =

Marmora
- Comune
- Comune di Marmora
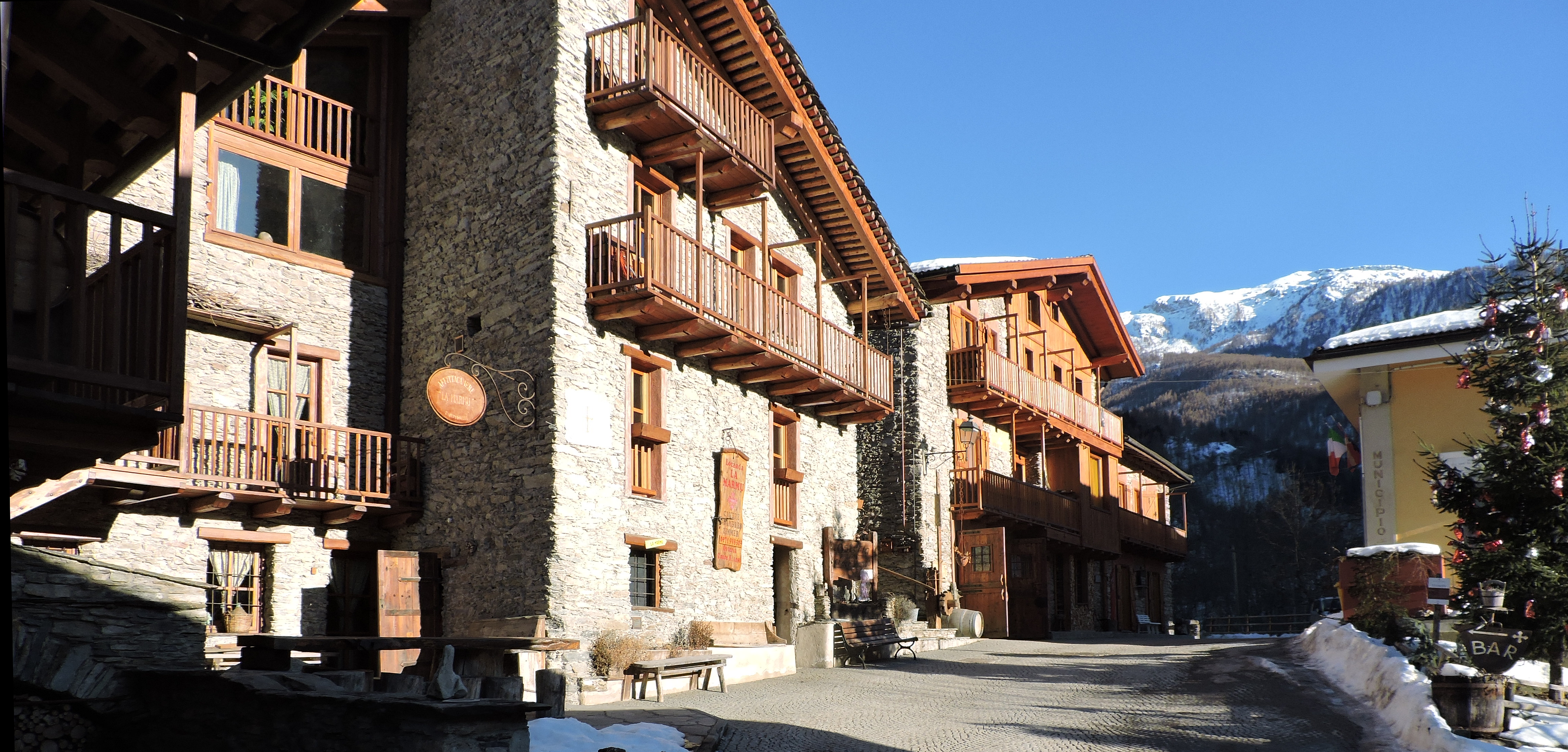
- Village centre

- Location within Italy Location within Piedmont
- Coordinates: 44°28′N 7°6′E
- Country: Italy
- Region: Piedmont
- Province: Province of Cuneo (CN)
- Frazioni: Tolosano, Torello, Garino, Urzio, Arvaglia, Arata, Reinero, Finello, S. Sebastiano, Vernetti

Area
  - Total: 41.2 km^{2} (15.9 sq mi)
- Elevation: 1,223 m (4,012 ft)

Population (Dec. 2004)
  - Total: 97
  - Density: 2.4/km^{2} (6.1/sq mi)
- Time zone: UTC+1 (CET)
  - Summer (DST): UTC+2 (CEST)
- Postal code: 12020
- Dialing code: 0171

Marmora is a comune (municipality) in the Province of Cuneo in the Italian region Piedmont, located about 80 kilometres (50 mi) southwest of Turin and about 35 kilometres (22 mi) west of Cuneo. As of 31 December 2004, it had a population of 97 and an area of 41.2 square kilometres (15.9 mi^{2}).

The municipality of Marmora contains the frazioni (subdivisions, mainly villages and hamlets) Tolosano, Torello, Garino, Urzio, Arvaglia, Arata, Reinero, Finello, S. Sebastiano, and Vernetti.

Marmora borders the following municipalities: Canosio, Castelmagno, Celle di Macra, Demonte, Macra, Prazzo, Sambuco, and Stroppo.

== Demographic evolution ==
Historical population

| Year | Pop. | ±% |
|---|---|---|
| 1861 | 1,088 | — |
| 1871 | 1,026 | −5.7% |
| 1881 | 1,073 | +4.6% |
| 1901 | 902 | −15.9% |
| 1911 | 982 | +8.9% |

| Year | Pop. | ±% |
|---|---|---|
| 1921 | 762 | −22.4% |
| 1931 | 645 | −15.4% |
| 1936 | 553 | −14.3% |
| 1951 | 446 | −19.3% |
| 1961 | 353 | −20.9% |

| Year | Pop. | ±% |
|---|---|---|
| 1971 | 211 | −40.2% |
| 1981 | 173 | −18.0% |
| 1991 | 140 | −19.1% |
| 2001 | 99 | −29.3% |

Source: Data from ISTAT

== See also ==
- Punta Tempesta
