= Monte Oserot =

Mountain in the Cozie Alps, Italy

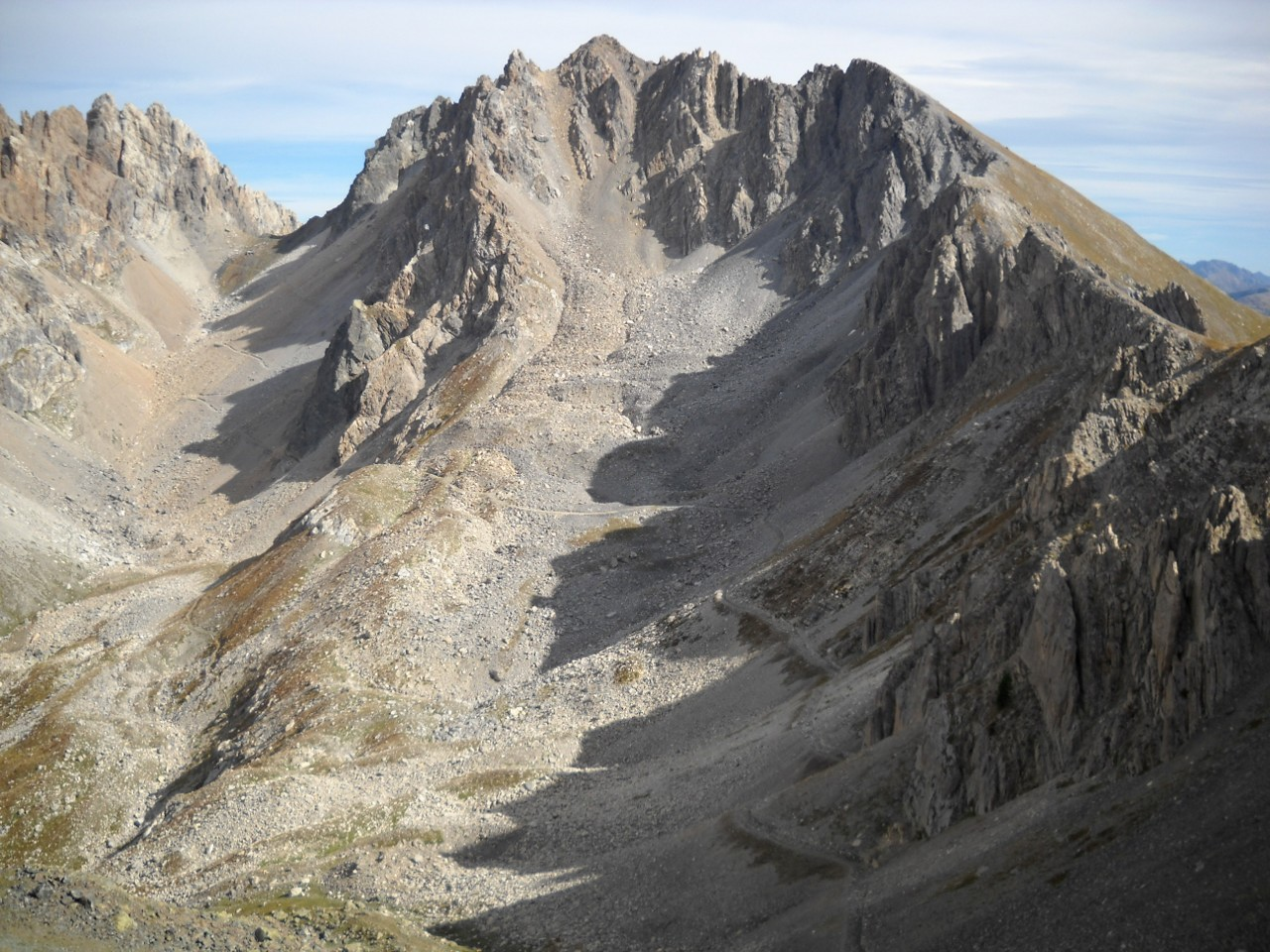
- The northwest slope of Monte Oserot

Highest point
- Elevation: 2,860 m (9,380 ft)
- Prominence: 210 m (690 ft)
- Isolation: 6.52 km (4.05 mi)
- Coordinates: 44°24′06″N 6°59′15″E

Naming
- Language of name: Italian

Geography
- Location within Piedmont Location within Italy
- Province: Province of Cuneo
- Region: Piedmont
- Parent range: Cottian Alps; Monviso Alps

Monte Oserot is a mountain in the Cottian Alps, located in Italian territory between the Stura and Maira valleys.

== Characteristics ==
It is situated on the southern edge of the Cozie Alps, on the watershed separating the Stura di Demonte Valley from the Maira Valley. The summit rises in the Province of Cuneo, straddling the municipal territories of Argentera to the south and Acceglio to the north, in a morphologically complex area.

The main Alpine watershed passes a few kilometers to the northeast, initially trending NW-SE to Monte Vanclava, where it sharply turns and takes an ESE direction toward the Colle della Maddalena. From Monte Vanclava, a secondary ridge branches off, descending southeast through Monte Scaletta and Il Bric, then turning east at Passo la Croce, bending SE again, and reaching the elevation of 2814 m, where it turns east, ascending to the summit of Monte Oserot. From here, it turns NE to the Colle Oserot, then SE again toward the Passo di Rocca Brancia. In this area, the ridge is well-defined on the SW slope (Stura Valley), while it is less defined on the NE slope (Maira Valley), where the rugged Gardetta Plateau dominates. A secondary ridge branches from the summit, heading SE, first descending to a small col, then ascending to a secondary peak called False Monte Oserot (2,761 m); from here, the ridge continues to descend, initially SE, then, from the Passo di Terra Rossa, slightly turning south, fading into the Stura Valley below the Servagno hamlet. Another ridge branches off in an arc from the 2814 m elevation, first eastward, then turning south. Yet another less pronounced ridge branches from the summit in a NW direction.

The northeast slope of the secondary ridge descends fairly regularly toward the underlying Fonda Oserot, where the Lago Oserot is located; on the opposite slope, the mountain is more rugged, descending with steep and uneven ledges toward the underlying Testa dell'Iretta (2,189 m) and the Bersezio hamlet. The ridge between the summit and the False Oserot is very steep on both sides. The northern slope is dominated by the secondary ridge, which separates two small valleys descending, one toward the Colle Oserot and then toward the Comba Emanuel, the other directly toward the Comba Emanuel.

From a geological perspective, the mountain belongs to the Briançonnais zone; the summit portion is composed of dolomitic limestone and dolomite from the Triassic, with a band of carniole from the Triassic emerging south of the False Oserot; between the summit and the Passo di Terra Rossa, a formation of porphyrites and epidotites from the Carboniferous-Permian emerges.

The toponymic and cartographic situation requires some attention. Older maps indicate the False Oserot as Monte Oserot, while they do not mark the true Oserot. This is the case, for example, with the IGM 1:25,000 cartography, which also indicates an elevation of approximately 2,860 m about 100 meters north of the False Oserot summit. The Carta dei sentieri - Valle Maira of the Valle Maira Mountain Community indicates both peaks as Monte Oserot. The IGC 1:25,000 map no. 112 indicates the 2,861 m elevation as Monte Oserot and does not assign a name to the False Oserot, which is marked with an elevation of 2,773 m.

== Access to the summit ==
The normal route follows the SE slope. Just below the Colle Oserot, a trail marked with faded red blazes branches off westward, leading to the base of a gully SE of the mountain, which ascends toward the NE ridge, through which the summit is reached. The starting point can be reached from Bersezio via the Passo di Terra Rossa (trails P37 and P36 GTA), from Servagno (trails P35-P36 GTA), or from the Maira Valley, through the Colle Oserot (trails S11 or S27) or the Passo di Rocca Brancia with trail P35 GTA. In the latter case, it is possible to use the Gardetta Refuge on the namesake plateau. Arriving from the Passo di Terra Rossa, a trail leads directly to the Colle Oserot, maintaining elevation on the northeastern slope of the secondary ridge.

The mountain is also accessible in winter, with a ski mountaineering approach and ascent of the final gullies using crampons and ice axe. A direct approach from Bersezio is also possible via the Gorgia della Madonna, a valley that ascends directly toward the summit in a NE direction. Upon reaching a plateau at about 2,500 m, at the base of a wide cirque enclosed by the SE secondary ridge and the 2,814 m elevation, one ascends first via a slope, then through a gully to the ridge, and from there to the summit.

== Bibliography ==
=== Cartography ===
- Official Italian cartography of the Istituto Geografico Militare (IGM) at scales 1:25,000 and 1:100,000, available online
- Territorial Information System of the Province of Cuneo, based on 1:10,000 cartography
- Istituto Geografico Centrale - Trail map 1:50,000 no. 7 Valli Maira, Grana e Stura and 1:25,000 no. 112 Valle Stura - Vinadio - Argentera
- Province of Cuneo - Valle Maira Mountain Community: Trail map scale 1:25,000 Valle Maira
