= Monica Ciaburro =

Italian politician (born 1970)

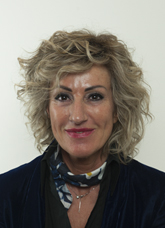
- Ciaburro in 2018

Member of the Chamber of Deputies
- Incumbent
- Assumed office 23 March 2018
- Constituency: Piedmont 2 – 01 (2018–2022); Piedmont 2 – 05 (2022–present)

Personal details
- Born: 12 April 1970 (age 56)
- Party: Brothers of Italy (since 2012)

Monica Ciaburro (born 12 April 1970) is an Italian politician serving as a member of the Chamber of Deputies since 2018. She has served as mayor of Argentera since 2017.
