= Punta Tempesta =

Mountain in Italy

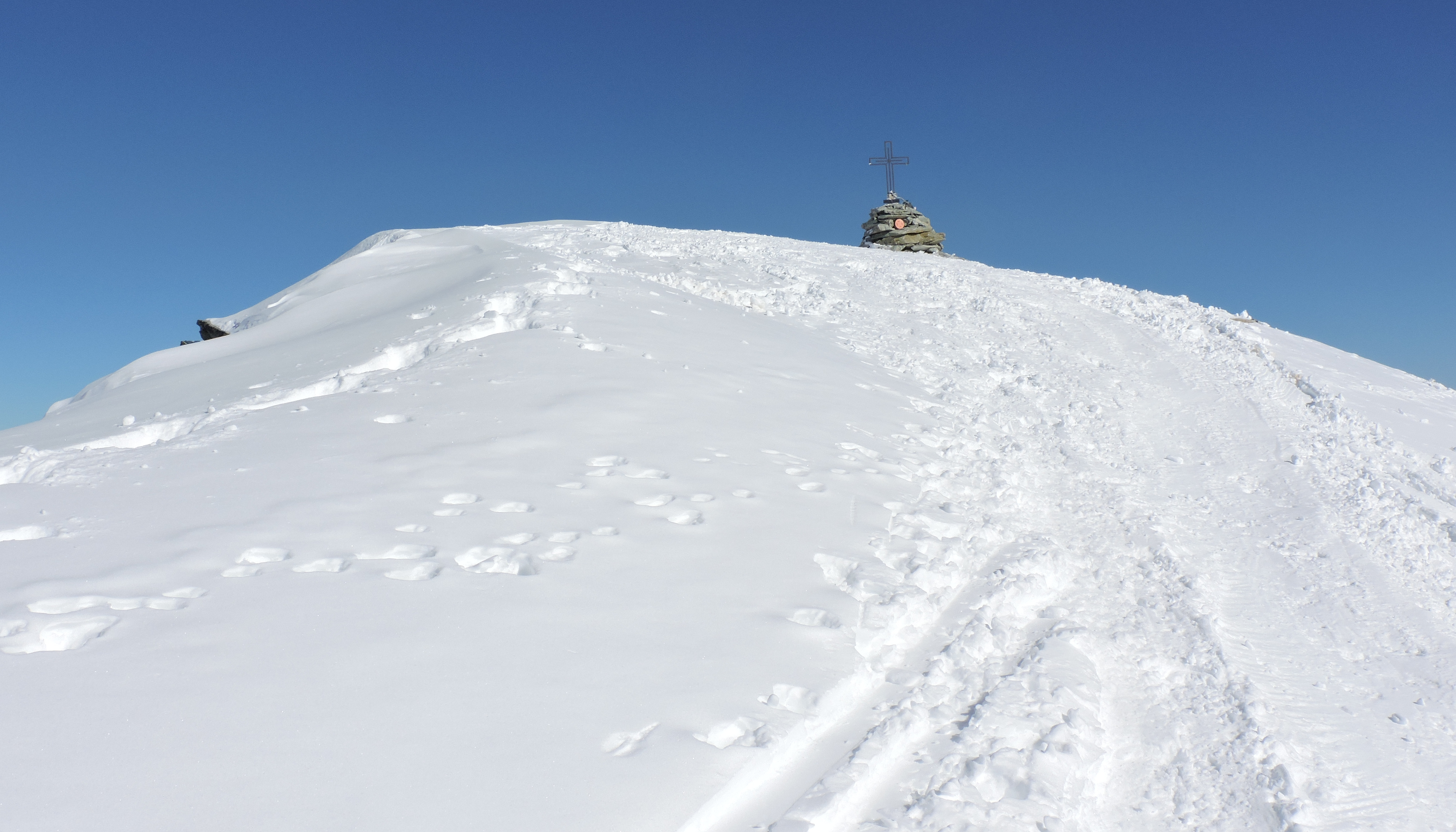

Highest point
- Elevation: 2,679 m (8,789 ft)
- Prominence: 309 m (1,014 ft)
- Listing: Alpine mountains 2500-2999 m
- Coordinates: 44°25′18.62″N 07°08′20.83″E

Geography
- Location within Alps
- Location: Piedmont, Italy
- Parent range: Cottian Alps

Climbing
- Easiest route: footpath

Punta Tempesta is a 2,679 m a.s.l. mountain of the Cottian Alps, located in Italy.

== Etymology ==
The name Tempesta in Italian means Storm.

== Geography ==
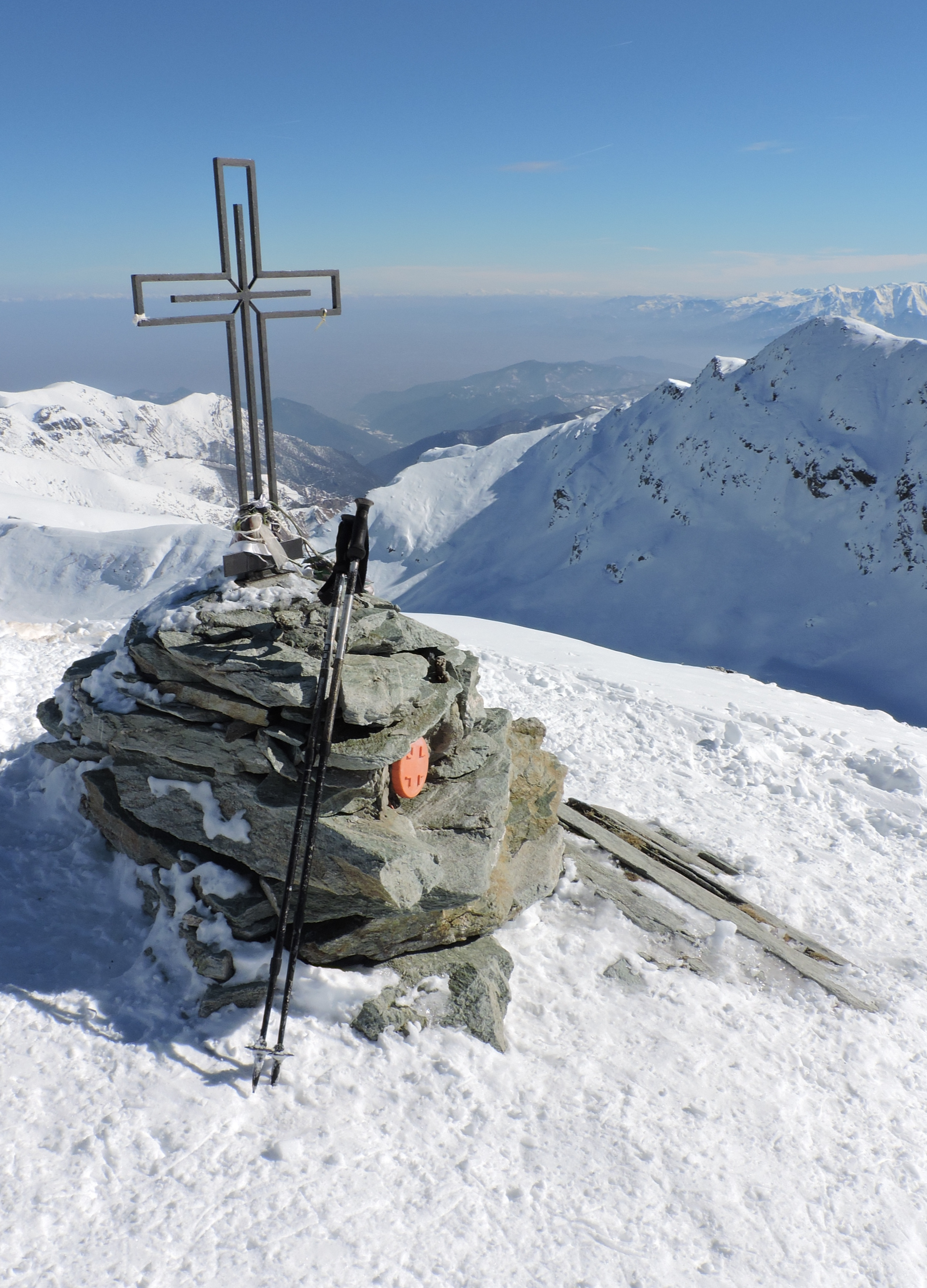
Summit cross, on its right Monte Tibert

The mountain is located on a ridge which divides two sub-valleys of the Maira watershed, Vallone di Marmora (west) and Vallone di Intersile; its summit stands not faraway from the water divide between Valle Maira and Valle Grana. Punta tempesta is separated from the neighbouring Monte Tibert by the Intersile Pass (2.520 m), while heading SE Sibolet Pass (2.546 m) divides it from Punta Sibolet (2581 m). Towards North the ridge between Marmora and Intersile sub-valleys goes on with a mountain named Punta La Piovosa (in English Rainy Summit, 2.602 m).

Punta Tempesta administratively belongs to the Marmora municipality (comune).

=== SOIUSA classification ===
According to SOIUSA (International Standardized Mountain Subdivision of the Alps) the mountain can be classified in the following way:

- main part = Western Alps
- major sector = North Western Alps
- section = Cottian Alps
- subsection = Alpi del Monviso
- supergroup =Gruppo del Chambeyron in senso ampio
- group = Gruppo dell'Oserot
- subgroup = Gruppo della Meja
- code = I/A-4.I-A.2.b

== Access to the summit ==
Punta Tempesta is accessible via waymarked footpaths from different locations. Among them can be cited Esischie Pass, Santuario di San Magno (in Valle Grana, 1.761 m) and Tolosano, a frazione (village) of Marmora. In the Italian scale tweir hiking difficulty is rated E (Escursionisti, namely suitable for normal hikers). Sometimes the hikers also reach monte Tibert or other nearby mountains. During winter Punta Tempesta is also a popular destination for alpine skiers or hikers with snowshoes.

== Maps ==
- Istituto Geografico Militare (IGM) official maps of Italy, 1:25.000 and 1:100.000 scale, on-line version
- Istituto Geografico Centrale - Carta dei sentieri e dei rifugi scala 1:50.000 n. 7 Valli Maira-Grana-Stura

== Photo gallery ==
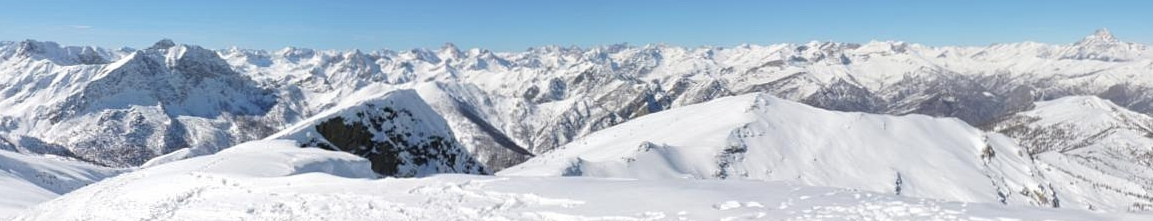
Winter panorama from the summit looking North

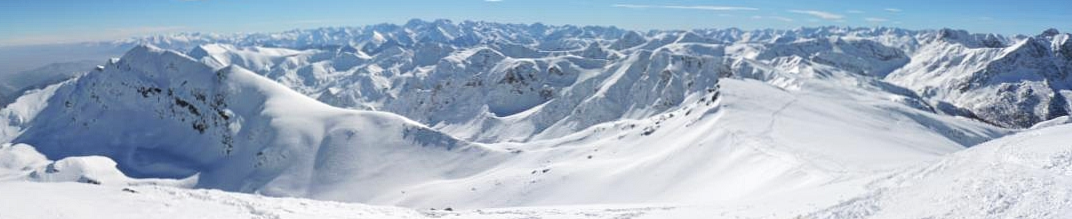
Winter panorama from the summit looking South
