= Rocca la Meja =

Mountain in Italy

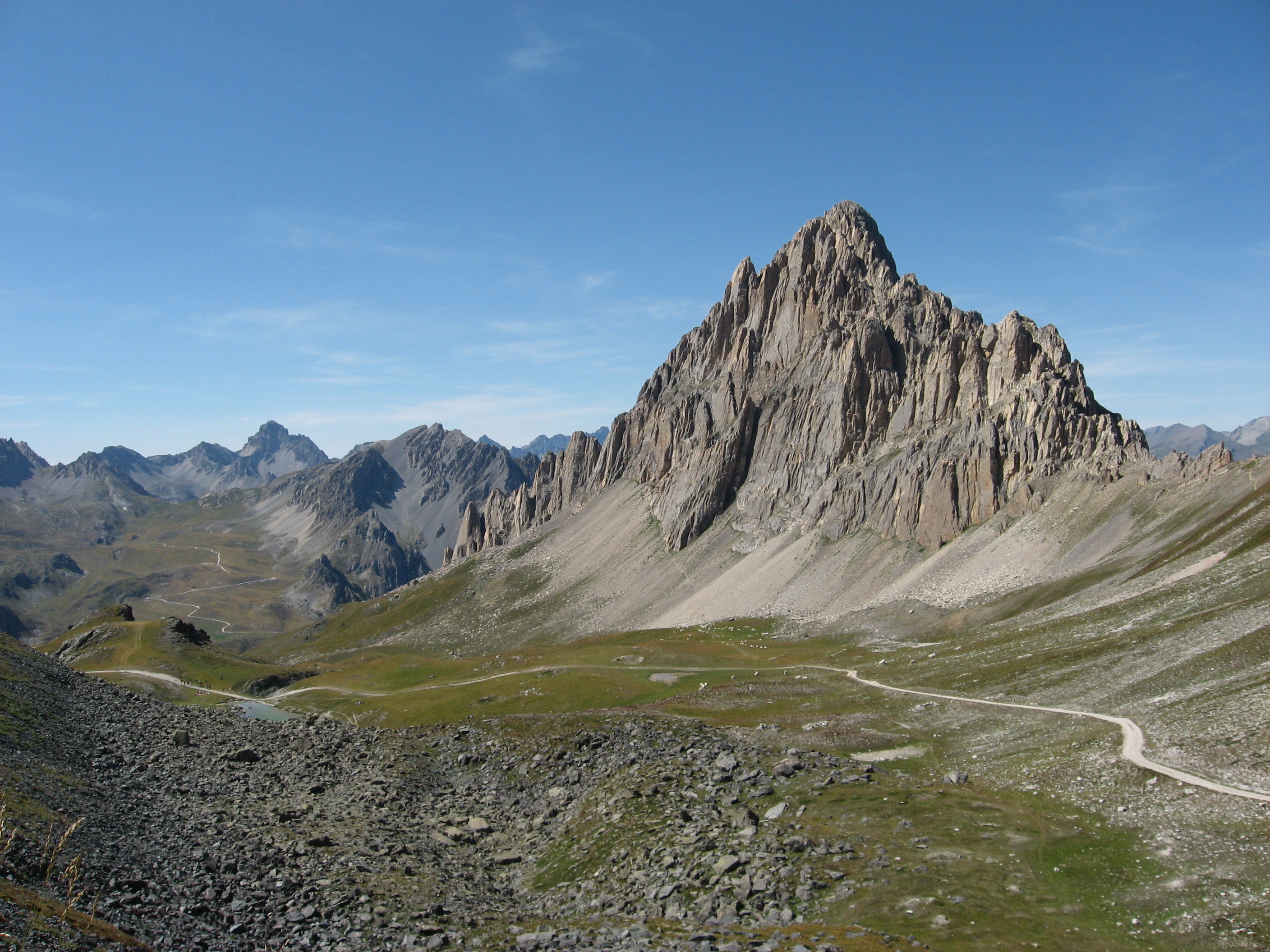
- Rocca la Meja seen from Colle d'Ancoccia

Highest point
- Elevation: 2,831 m (9,288 ft)
- Prominence: 437 m (1,434 ft)
- Listing: Alpine mountains 2500-2999 m
- Coordinates: 44°25′N 07°20′E

Geography
- Location: Piedmont, Italy
- Parent range: Cottian Alps

Climbing
- First ascent: September 17, 1895 by G. Bobba

Rocca la Meja is a mountain in the Cottian Alps, in the comune of Canosio, Piedmont, northern Italy. It has an altitude of 2,831 m and it is located in the Maira Valley.

Of pyramidal shape, it is mostly composed of dolomitic limestone, and stands in a plateau known as Meja-Gardetta.

== Geography ==
Administratively the mountain belongs to the Province of Cuneo.

Nearby there is a lake called Lago della Meja.

== SOIUSA classification ==
According to the SOIUSA (International Standardized Mountain Subdivision of the Alps) the mountain can be classified in the following way:

- main part = Western Alps
- major sector = South Western Alps
- section = Cottian Alps
- subsection = southern Cottian Alps
- supergroup = Catena Chambeyron-Mongioia-Marchisa
- group = gruppo Gruppo dell'Oserot
- subgroup = Gruppo della Meja
- code = I/A-4.I-A.2.b
