= Pietraporzio =

- Comune
- Comune di Pietraporzio
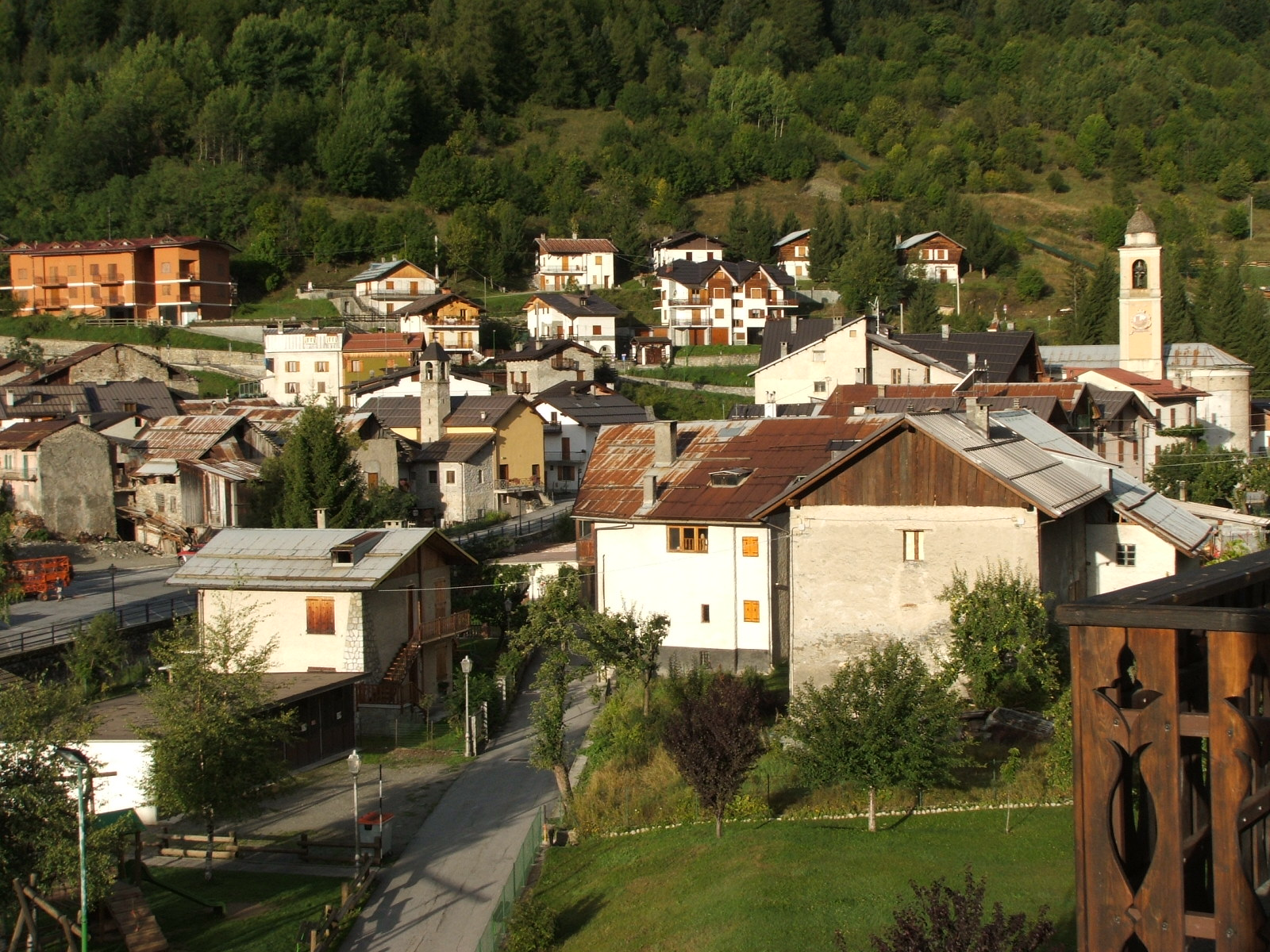

- Location within Italy Location within Piedmont
- Coordinates: 44°21′N 7°2′E
- Country: Italy
- Region: Piedmont
- Province: Cuneo (CN)

Government
  - Mayor: Marco Frigerio

Area
  - Total: 55.19 km^{2} (21.31 sq mi)
- Elevation: 1,246 m (4,088 ft)

Population (31 December 2010)
  - Total: 94
  - Density: 1.7/km^{2} (4.4/sq mi)
- Demonym: Pietraporziesi
- Time zone: UTC+1 (CET)
  - Summer (DST): UTC+2 (CEST)
- Postal code: 12010
- Dialing code: 0171
- Website: Official website

Pietraporzio is a comune (municipality) in the Province of Cuneo in the Italian region Piedmont, located in the Valle Stura about 100 kilometres (62 mi) southwest of Turin and about 40 kilometres (25 mi) west of Cuneo, on the border with France.

Pietraporzio borders the following municipalities: Argentera, Canosio, Saint-Etienne-de-Tinée (France), Sambuco, and Vinadio.
