= Sambuco =

- Comune
- Comune di Sambuco
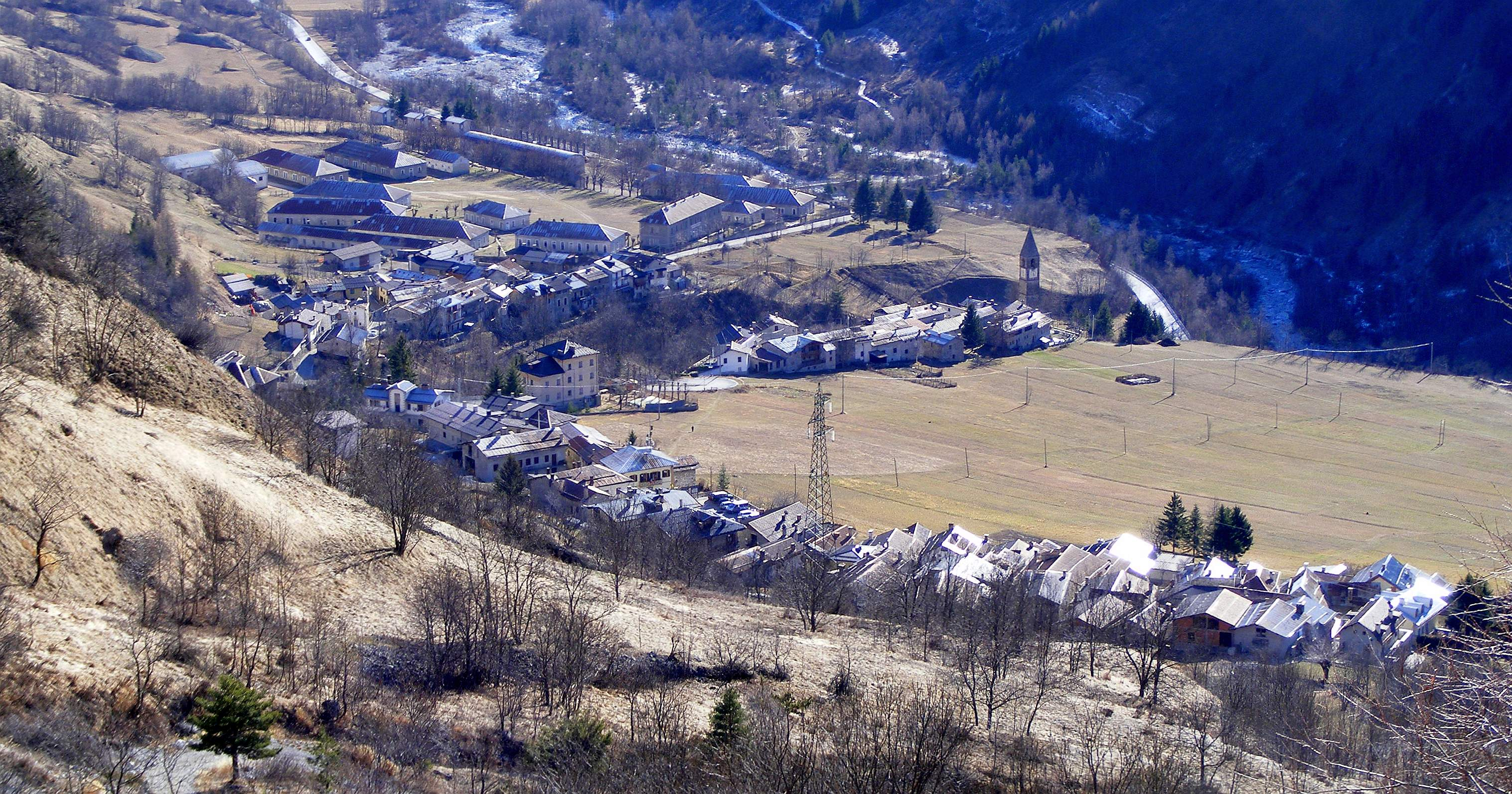
- Panorama from Serre

- Location within Italy Location within Piedmont
- Coordinates: 44°20′N 7°5′E
- Country: Italy
- Region: Piedmont
- Province: Province of Cuneo (CN)

Area
  - Total: 46.8 km^{2} (18.1 sq mi)

Population (Dec. 2004)
  - Total: 92
  - Density: 2.0/km^{2} (5.1/sq mi)
- Time zone: UTC+1 (CET)
  - Summer (DST): UTC+2 (CEST)
- Postal code: 12010
- Dialing code: 0171
- Website: Official Website of the municipality

Sambuco is a comune (municipality) in the Province of Cuneo in the Italian region Piedmont, located about 100 kilometres (62 mi) southwest of Turin and about 40 kilometres (25 mi) west of Cuneo. As of 31 December 2004, it had a population of 92 and an area of 46.8 square kilometres (18.1 mi^{2}).

Sambuco borders the following municipalities: Canosio, Demonte, Marmora, Pietraporzio, and Vinadio.

== Demographic evolution ==
Historical population

Year	Pop.	±%
1861	1,173	—
1871	1,394	+18.8%
1881	1,170	−16.1%
1901	671	−42.6%
1911	579	−13.7%

Year	Pop.	±%
1921	494	−14.7%
1931	312	−36.8%
1936	308	−1.3%
1951	264	−14.3%
1961	222	−15.9%

Year	Pop.	±%
1971	176	−20.7%
1981	150	−14.8%
1991	110	−26.7%
2001	89	−19.1%

Source: Data from ISTAT
