= Enciastraia =

Mountain in Italy

- Tête de l'Enchastraye
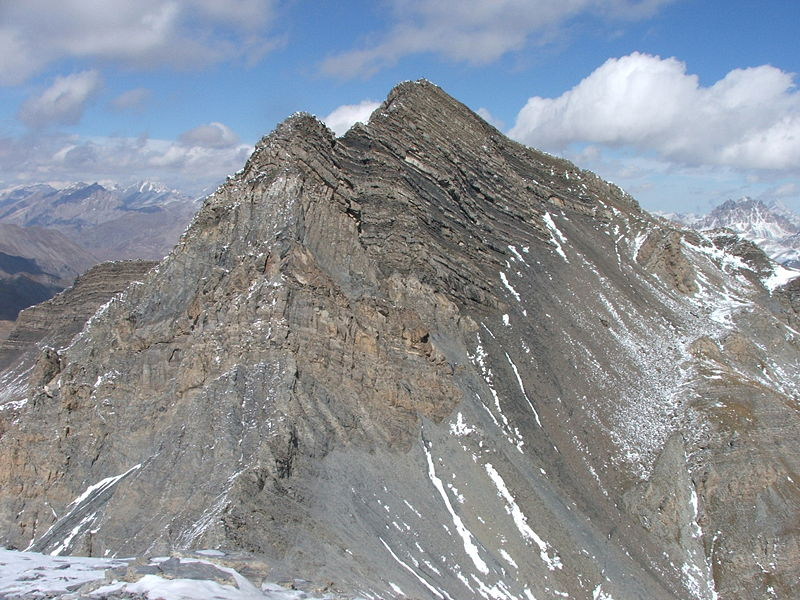
- Enciastraia seen from the Rocca dei Tre Vescovi.

Highest point
- Elevation: 2,955 m (9,695 ft)
- Prominence: 318 m (1,043 ft)
- Listing: Alpine mountains 2500-2999 m
- Coordinates: 44°22′00″N 6°53′24″E

Geography
- Location within Alps
- Location: Piedmont, Italy; Provence-Alpes-Côte d'Azur, France
- Parent range: Maritime Alps

Enciastraia (French: Tête de l'Enchastraye) is a mountain in the Maritime Alps, on the boundary between the province of Cuneo (Piedmont, northern Italy) and the French region of Provence-Alpes-Côte-d'Azur.

== SOIUSA classification ==
According to the SOIUSA (International Standardized Mountain Subdivision of the Alps) the mountain can be classified in the following way:

- main part = Western Alps
- major sector = South Western Alps
- section = Maritime Alps
- subsection = (Fr:Alpes Maritimes d.l.s.l./It:Alpi Marittime)
- supergroup = (Fr:Chaîne Corborant-Ténibre-Enchastraye/It:Catena Corborant-Tenibres-Enciastraia)
- group = (Fr:Massif Enchastraye-Siguret/It:Gruppo Enciastraia-Siguret)
- subgroup = (Fr:Groupe de l'Enchastraye/It:Gruppo dell'Enciastraia)
- code = I/A-2.1-C.12.a

== Sources ==
- Villani, Nanni (April 2002). Monte Argentera, tre metri sotto i tremila e trecento, in Piemonte Parchi - speciale Cime Tempestose. Regione Piemonte.

== Maps ==
- Italian official cartography (Istituto Geografico Militare - IGM); on-line version: www.pcn.minambiente.it
- French official cartography (Institut Géographique National - IGN); on-line version: www.geoportail.fr
