= Acceglio =

Acceglio Acelh
- Comune
- Comune di Acceglio
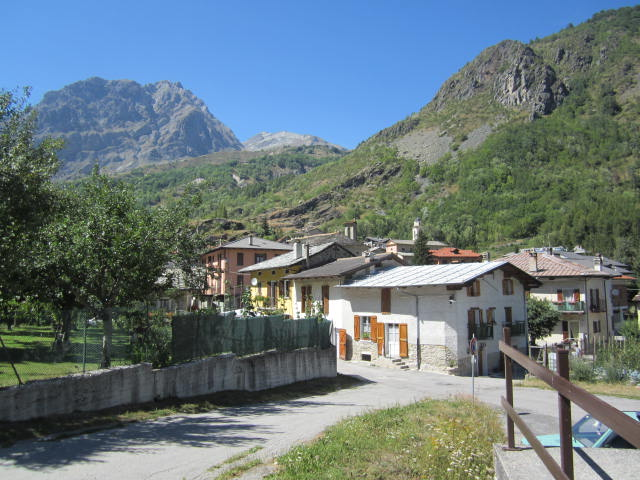
- Acceglio

- Location within Italy Location within Piedmont
- Coordinates: 44°29′N 6°59′E
- Country: Italy
- Region: Piedmont
- Province: Province of Cuneo (CN)
- Frazioni: See list

Government
  - Mayor: Giovanni Enrico Caranzano

Area
  - Total: 151.53 km^{2} (58.51 sq mi)
- Elevation: 1,200 m (3,900 ft)

Population (31 March 2018)
  - Total: 160
  - Density: 1.1/km^{2} (2.7/sq mi)
- Demonym: Accegliesi
- Time zone: UTC+1 (CET)
  - Summer (DST): UTC+2 (CEST)
- Postal code: 12021
- Dialing code: 0171
- Patron saint: Santa Maria Assunta
- Saint day: 15 August
- Website: Official website

Acceglio (Vivaro-Alpine: Acelh) is a comune (municipality) in the Province of Cuneo in the Italian region Piedmont. It is located above Prazzo in the upper Valle Maira about 90 kilometres (56 mi) southwest of Turin and about 45 kilometres (28 mi) west of Cuneo, on the border with France.

Acceglio borders the following municipalities: Argentera, Bellino, Canosio, Larche (France), Meyronnes (France), Prazzo, and Saint-Paul-sur-Ubaye (France).

== Tourism ==
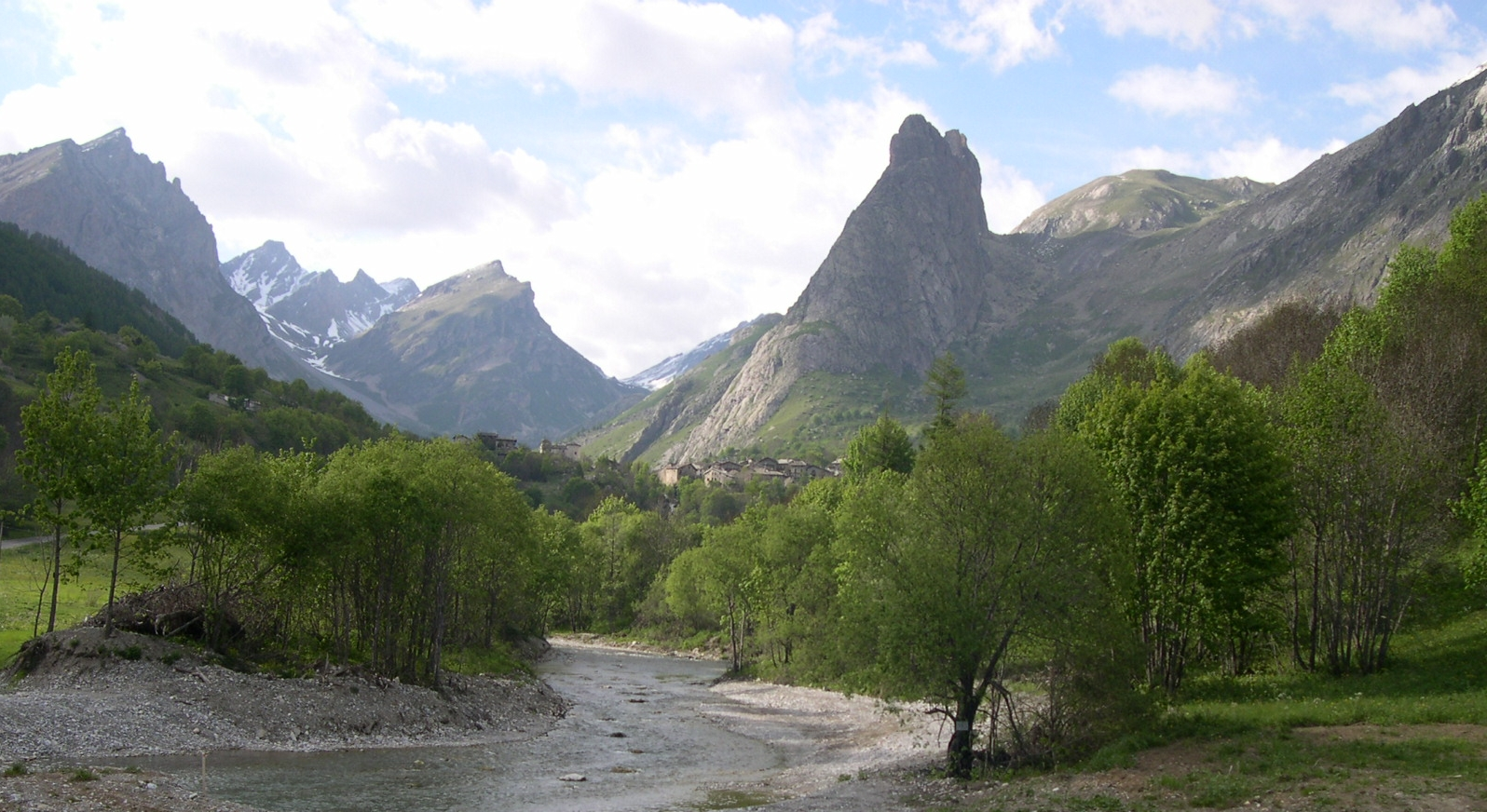
The high Val Maira, near Chiappera

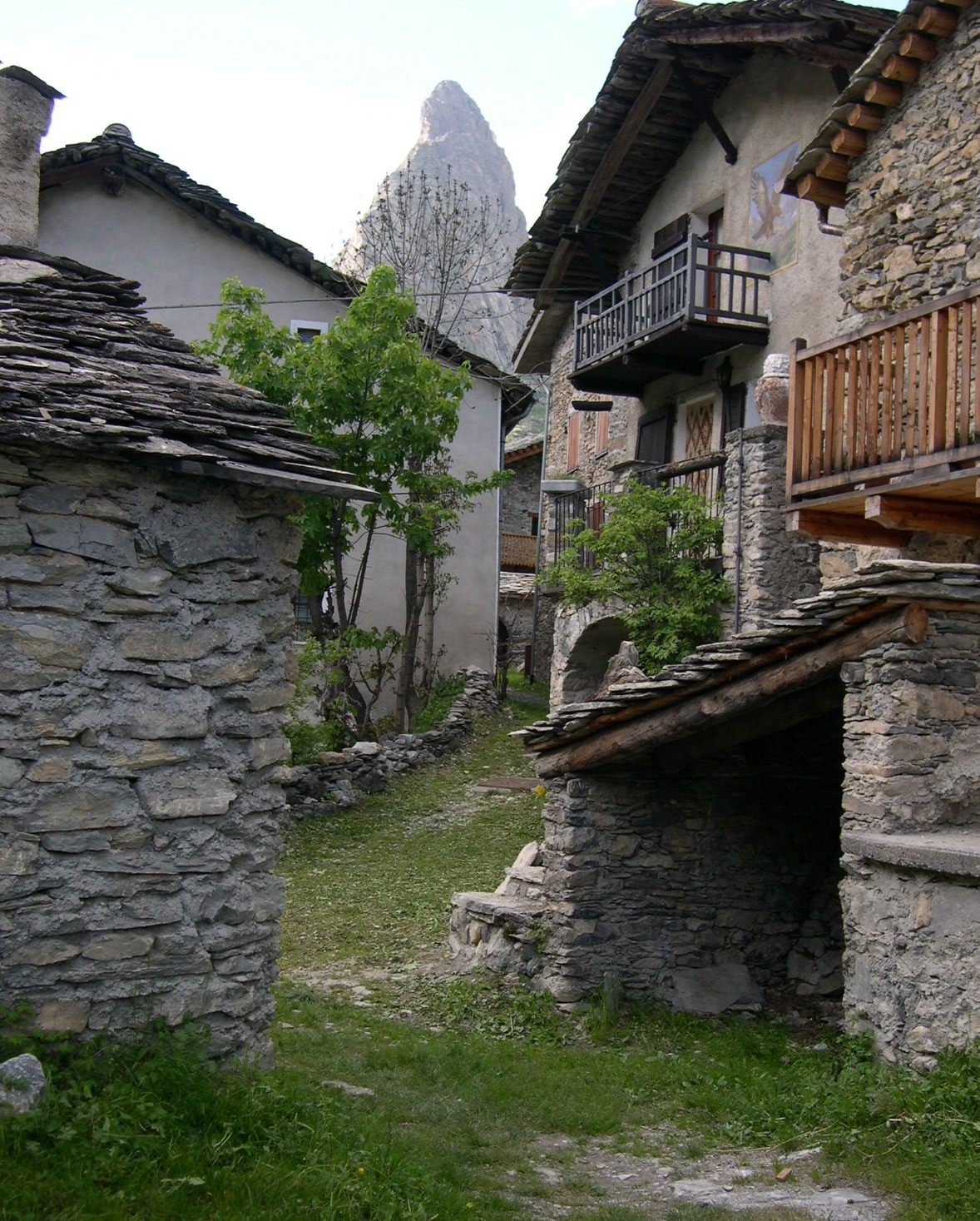
Chiappera, a hamlet within the commune

The territory of Acceglio, thanks to its intact natural environment, is a destination for hiking, mountain biking and mountaineering. To support those activities, Acceglio has several alpine huts:

- Rifugio Campo Base
- Rifugio Stroppia
- Bivacco Barenghi
- Bivacco Enrico e Mario

== Frazioni ==
Acceglio has 11 frazioni whose elevation above sea level varies between approximately 1,200 and 1,650 metres (3,940 and 5,410 ft):

- Villar (1375 m)
- Ponte Maira (1404 m)
- Saretto (1533 m)
- Chiappera (1614 m) (pictured)
- Bargia (1401 m)
- Lausetto (1510 m)
- Colombata (1576 m)
- Frere (1196 m)
- Gheit (1372 m)
- Chialvetta (1494 m)
- Pratorotondo (1639 m)

== Geography ==
=== Climate ===
According to the Köppen climate classification, Acceglio experiences a warm-summer humid continental climate (Dfb), influenced by its mid-latitude, sub-alpine location.

Climate data for Acceglio Saretto (1951-1980)
Month	Jan	Feb	Mar	Apr	May	Jun	Jul	Aug	Sep	Oct	Nov	Dec	Year
Average precipitation mm	52	61	71	78	96	87	53	66	84	113	86	62	907
Average precipitation inches	2.0	2.4	2.8	3.1	3.8	3.4	2.1	2.6	3.3	4.4	3.4	2.4	35.7
Source: www.isprambiente.gov.it
