= Prazzo =

- Comune
- Comune di Prazzo
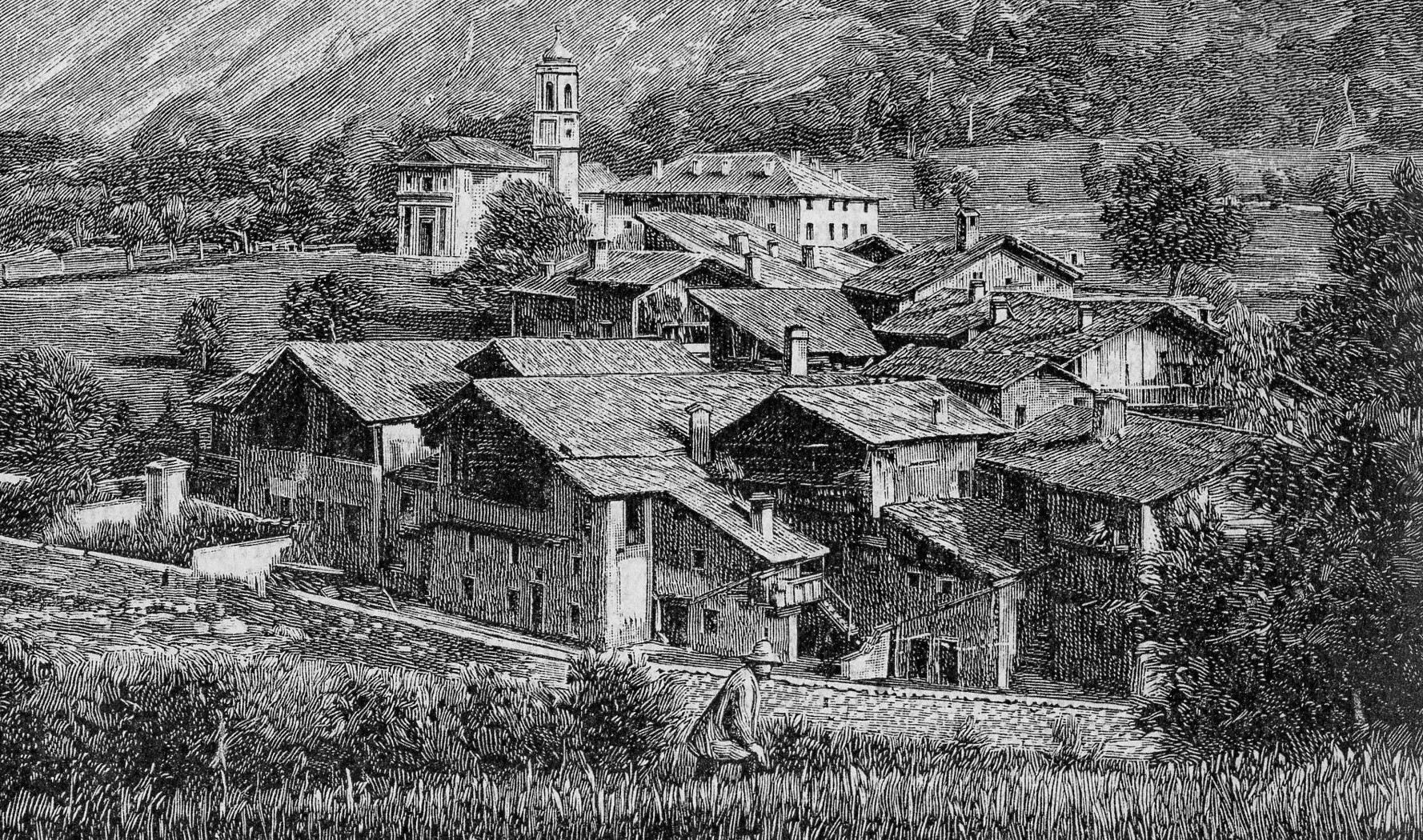

- Coat of arms

- Location within Italy Location within Piedmont
- Coordinates: 44°29′N 07°03′E
- Country: Italy
- Region: Piedmont
- Province: Cuneo (CN)
- Frazioni: Prazzo Superiore, Prazzo Inferiore, Borgo Nuovo, Maddalena, Ussolo, San Michele

Government
  - Mayor: Denisia Bonelli

Area
  - Total: 51 km^{2} (20 sq mi)
- Elevation: 1,030 m (3,380 ft)

Population (31 December 2010)
  - Total: 185
  - Density: 3.6/km^{2} (9.4/sq mi)
- Demonym: Prazzesi
- Time zone: UTC+1 (CET)
  - Summer (DST): UTC+2 (CEST)
- Postal code: 12028
- Dialing code: 0171
- Patron saint: St. James
- Saint day: July 25
- Website: Official website

Prazzo is comune of the province of Cuneo, in Piedmont, northern Italy.

The main village is split into two parts, Prazzo Superiore (upper) and Prazzo Inferiore (lower), at about 1 kilometre (0.6 miles) from each other on the national route 22. Prazzo is part of the local community of the "Valle Maira" valley.

The centre of the commune, containing the nursery and the primary school, a hotel, and most of the shops of the village, is located in Prazzo Superiore, while the parish church and an army base, at times used by various corps of the Italian Army and NATO for mountain training, are in Prazzo Inferiore.

Prazzo is about 1,000 metres (3,281 feet) above sea level and is located on the left side of Valle Maira, along which runs the Maira river.

== Economy ==
The local economy is based on agriculture, tourism, public offices and ENEL (Italy's main electric energy provider). The only public transport available is a bus service that, from the Cuneo railway station, serves the whole valley up to Acceglio.
