= Rocca dei Tre Vescovi =

Mountain in Italy

- Rocher des Trois Évêques
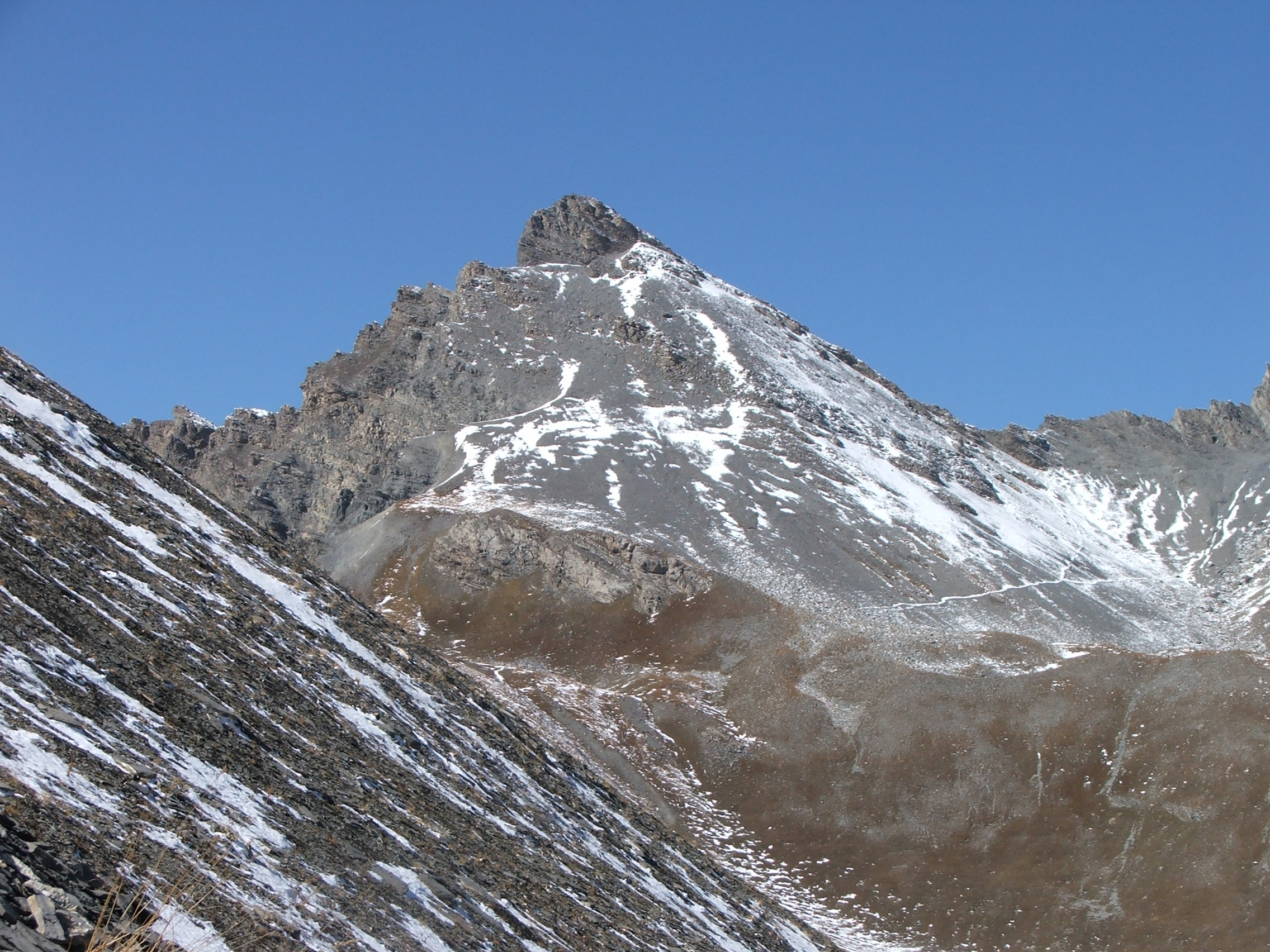
- Rocca dei Tre Vescovi seen from Bassa di Colombart.

Highest point
- Elevation: 2,867 m (9,406 ft)
- Prominence: 103.3 m (339 ft)
- Coordinates: 44°21′47″N 6°53′12″E

Geography
- Location within Alps
- Location: Piedmont, Italy; Provence-Alpes-Côte d'Azur, France
- Parent range: Maritime Alps

Climbing
- First ascent: E. Troya, P. Vigliardi and two unknown soldiers

Rocca dei Tre Vescovi (French: Rocher des Trois Évêques) is a mountain in the Maritime Alps, on the boundary between the province of Cuneo (Piedmont, northern Italy) and the French region of Provence-Alpes-Côte-d'Azur.

== Geography ==
Located near the Maddalena Pass, it is joined to the nearby Enciastraia peak by a ridge. The name, meaning "Rock of the Three Bishops", derives from the fact that the mount is on the intersection point of three Catholic dioceses, those of Cuneo, Nice and Digne.

=== SOIUSA classification ===
According to the SOIUSA (International Standardized Mountain Subdivision of the Alps) the mountain can be classified in the following way:

- main part = Western Alps
- major sector = South Western Alps
- section = Maritime Alps
- subsection = (Fr:Alpes Maritimes d.l.s.l./It:Alpi Marittime)
- supergroup = (Fr:Chaîne Corborant-Ténibre-Enchastraye/It:Catena Corborant-Tenibres-Enciastraia)
- group = (Fr:Massif Enchastraye-Siguret/It:Gruppo Enciastraia-Siguret)
- subgroup = (Fr:Groupe de l'Enchastraye/It:Gruppo dell'Enciastraia)
- code = I/A-2.1-C.12.a

== Sources ==
- Villani, Nanni (April 2002). Monte Argentera, tre metri sotto i tremila e trecento, in Piemonte Parchi - speciale Cime Tempestose (in Italian). Regione Piemonte.
