= 1962 =

1962 in various calendars
- Gregorian calendar: 1962; MCMLXII
- Ab urbe condita: 2715
- Armenian calendar: 1411; ԹՎ ՌՆԺԱ
- Assyrian calendar: 6712
- Baháʼí calendar: 118–119
- Balinese saka calendar: 1883–1884
- Bengali calendar: 1368–1369
- Berber calendar: 2912
- British Regnal year: 10 Eliz. 2 – 11 Eliz. 2
- Buddhist calendar: 2506
- Burmese calendar: 1324
- Byzantine calendar: 7470–7471
- Chinese calendar: 辛丑年 (Metal Ox); 4659 or 4452 — to — 壬寅年 (Water Tiger); 4660 or 4453
- Coptic calendar: 1678–1679
- Discordian calendar: 3128
- Ethiopian calendar: 1954–1955
- Hebrew calendar: 5722–5723
- Hindu calendars
- Vikram Samvat: 2018–2019
- Shaka Samvat: 1883–1884
- Kali Yuga: 5062–5063
- Holocene calendar: 11962
- Igbo calendar: 962–963
- Iranian calendar: 1340–1341
- Islamic calendar: 1381–1382
- Japanese calendar: Shōwa 37 (昭和３７年)
- Javanese calendar: 1893–1894
- Juche calendar: 51
- Julian calendar: Gregorian minus 13 days
- Korean calendar: 4295
- Minguo calendar: ROC 51 民國51年
- Nanakshahi calendar: 494
- Thai solar calendar: 2505
- Tibetan calendar: ལྕགས་མོ་གླང་ལོ་ (female Iron-Ox); 2088 or 1707 or 935 — to — ཆུ་ཕོ་སྟག་ལོ་ (male Water-Tiger); 2089 or 1708 or 936

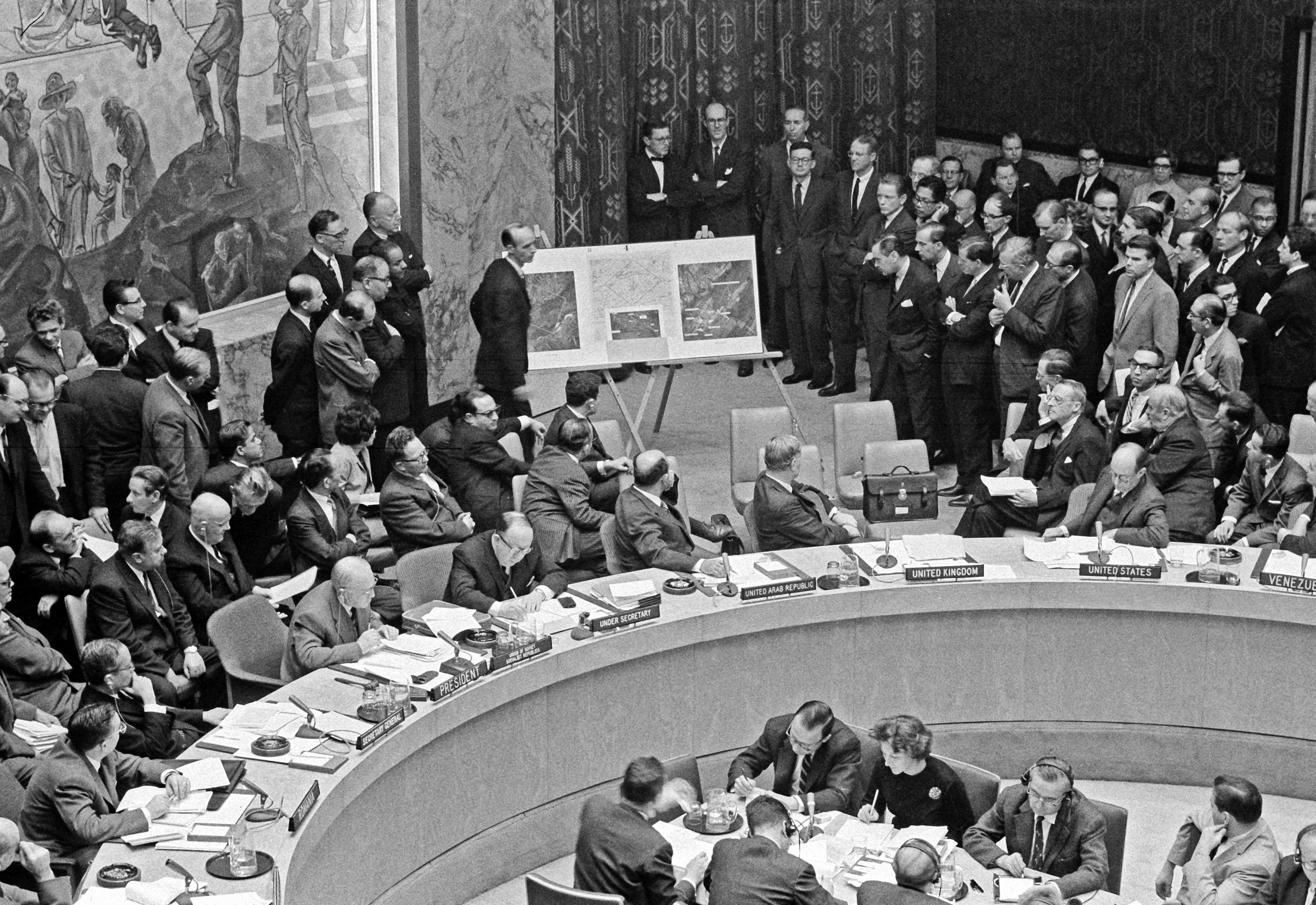
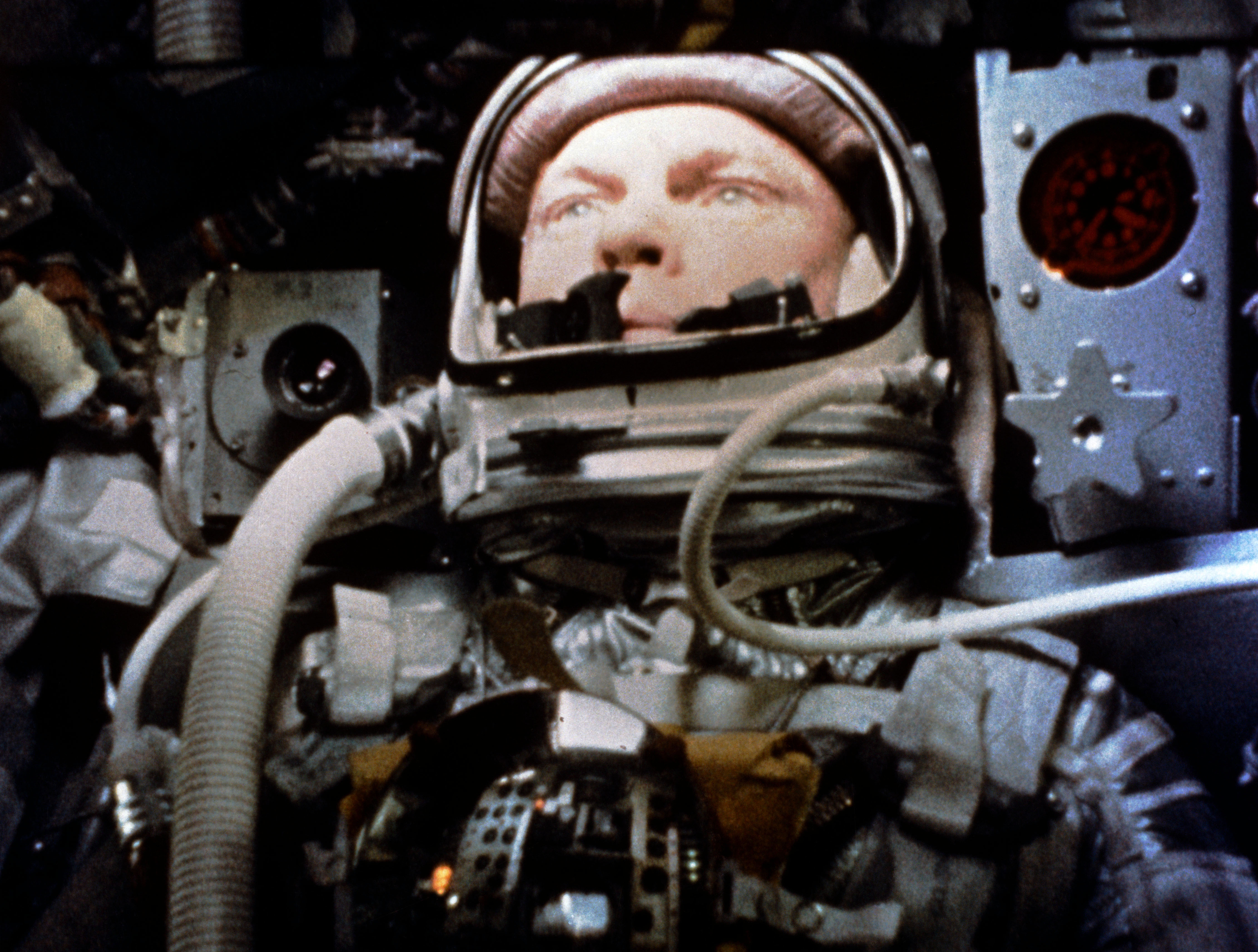
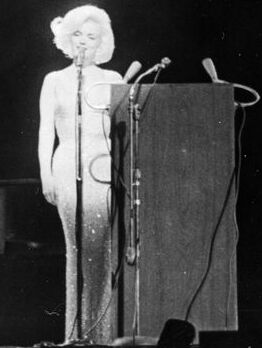
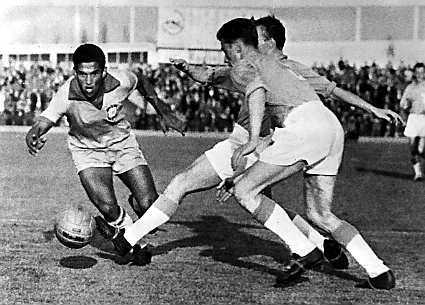
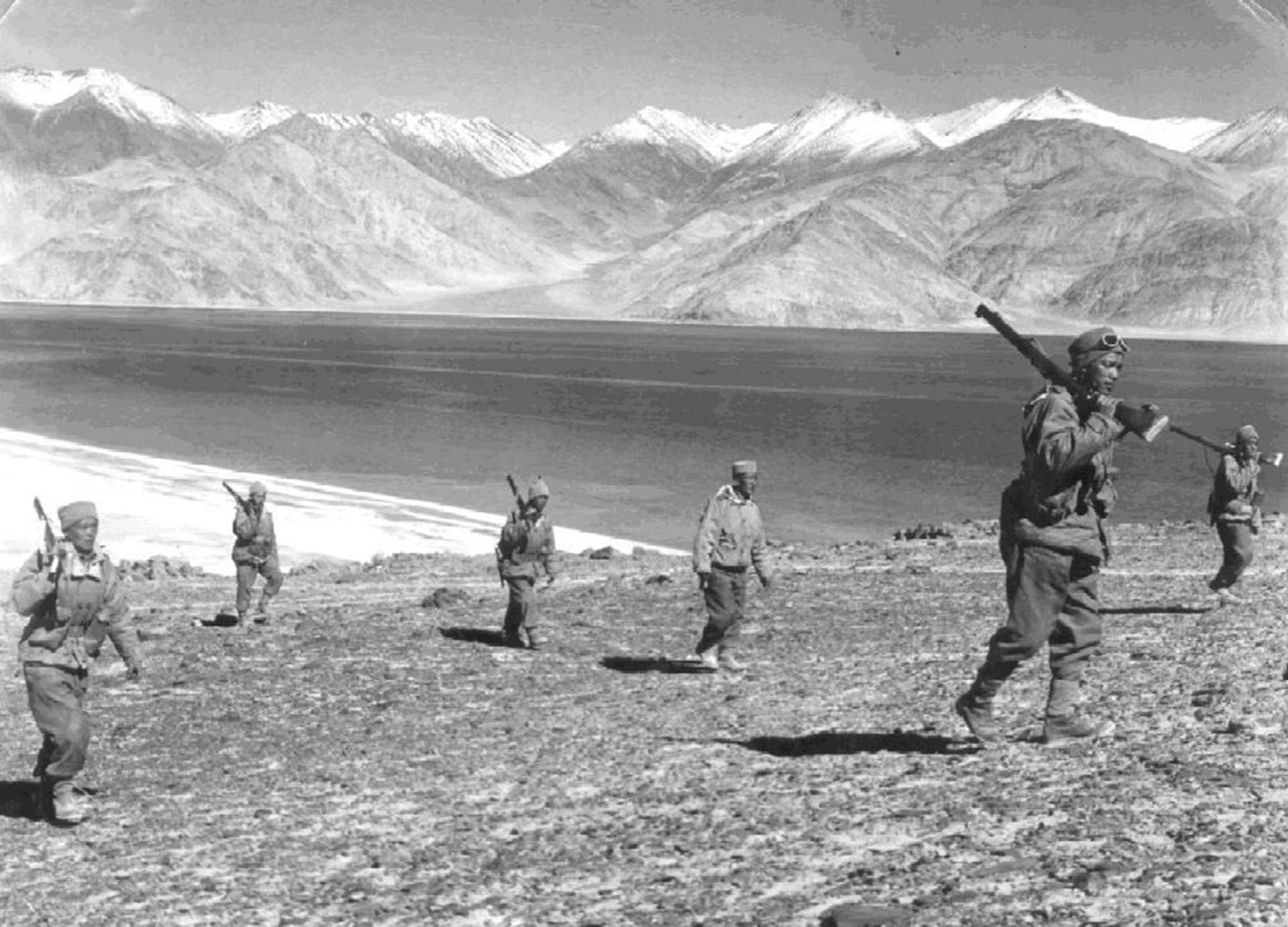
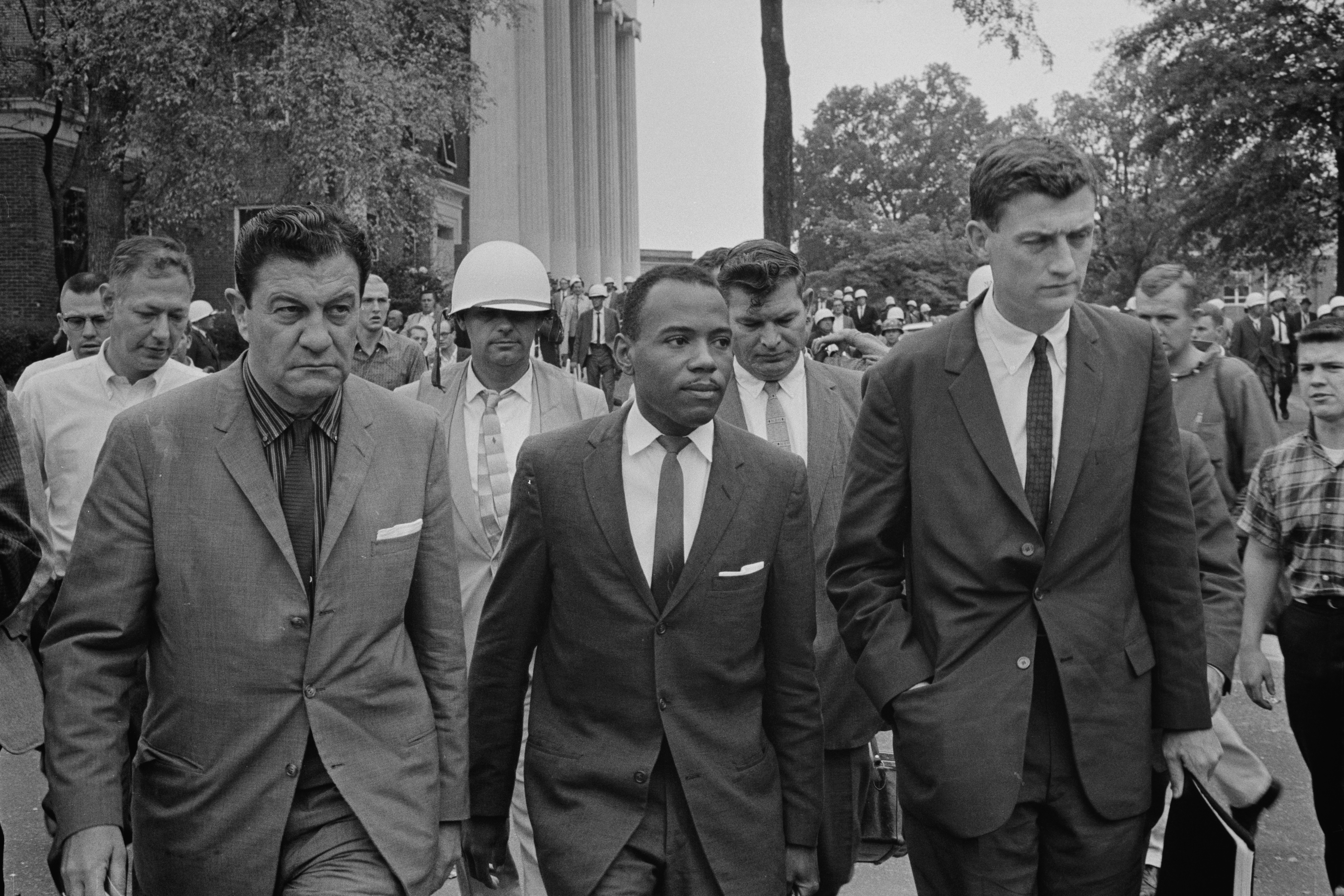
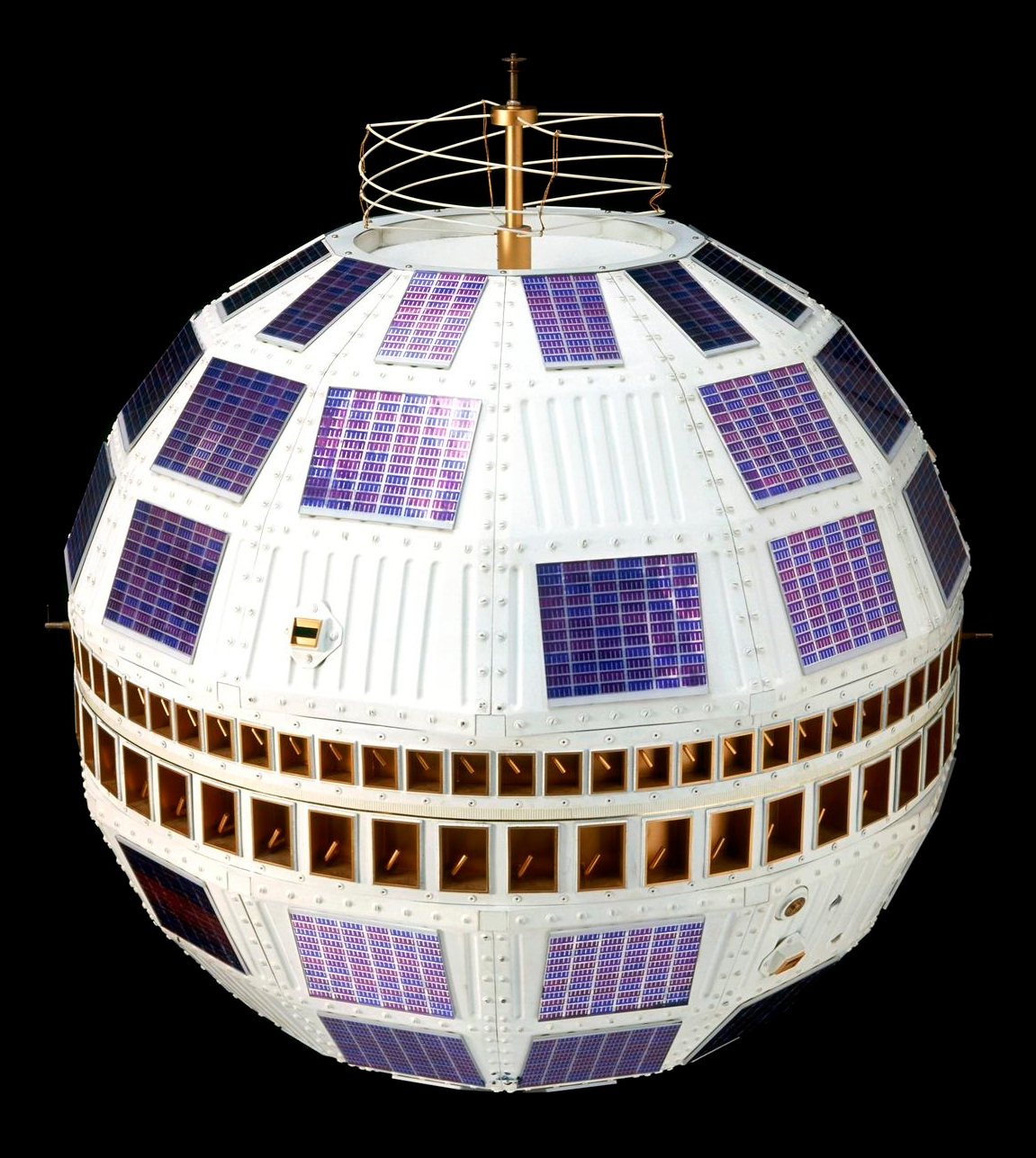
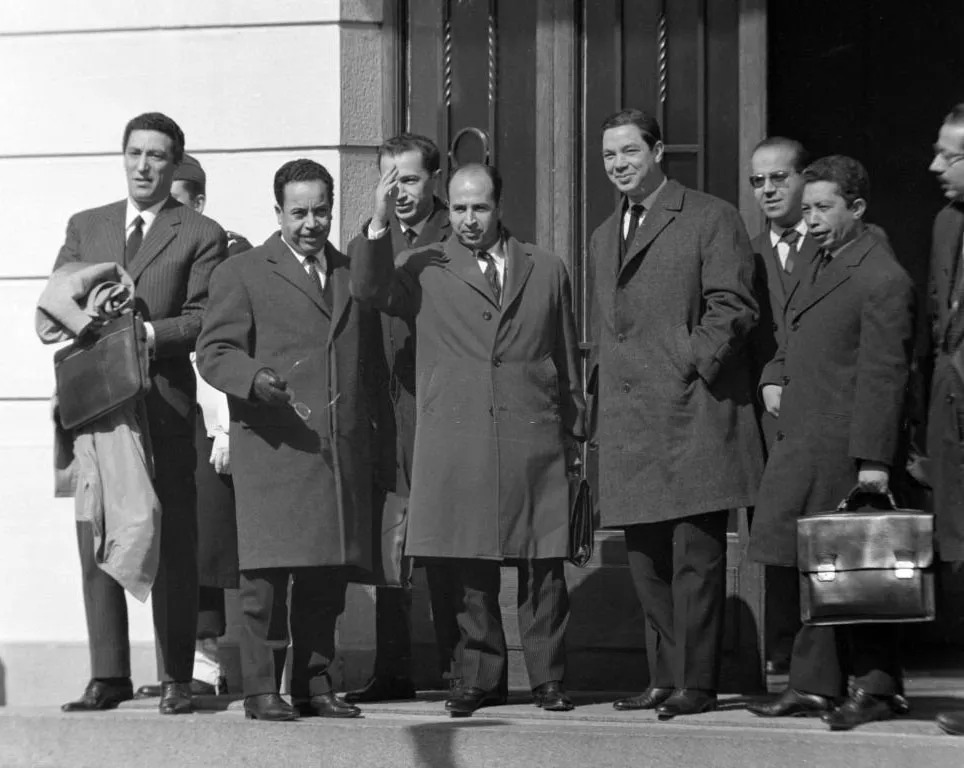
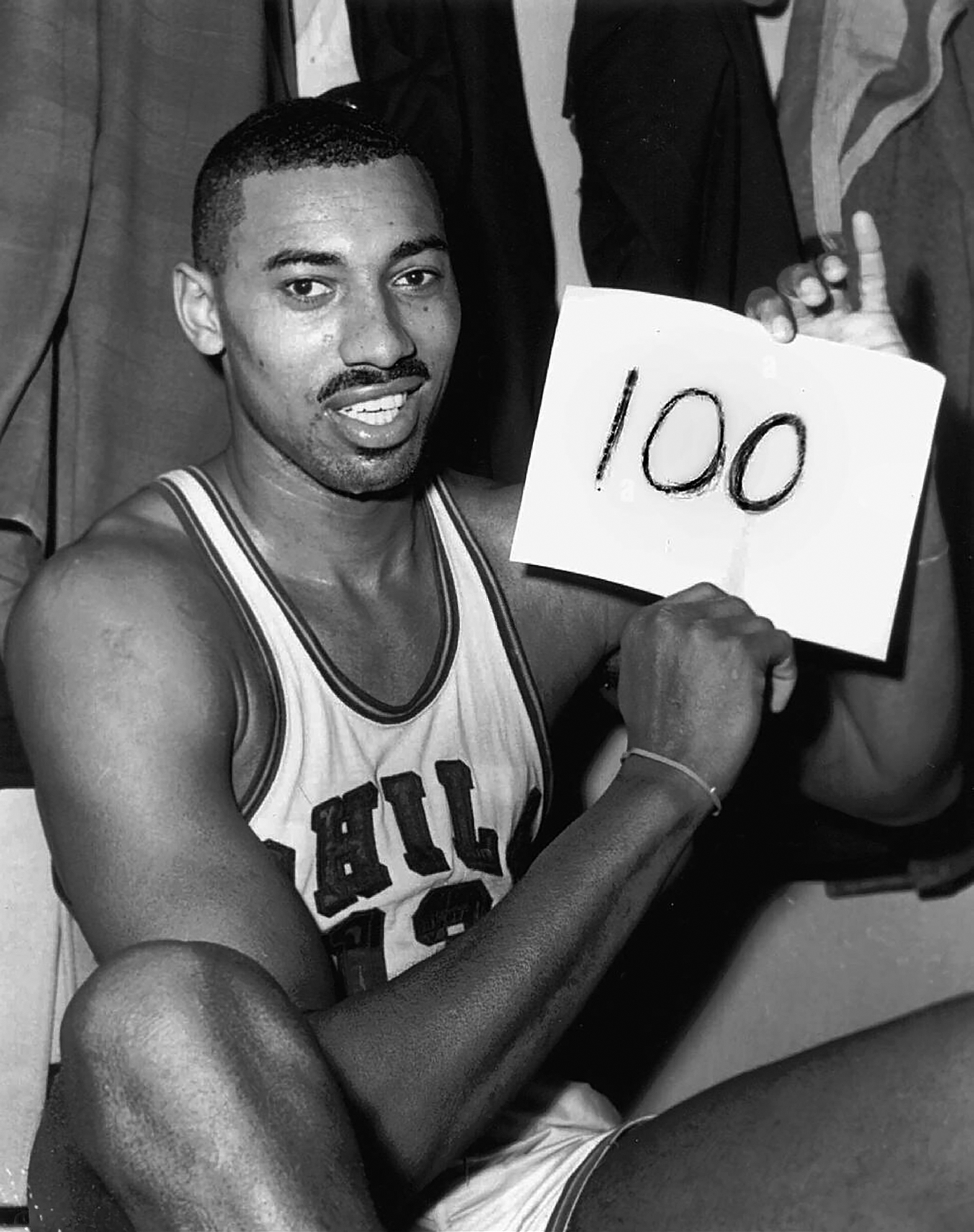
From top to bottom, left to right: The Cuban Missile Crisis brings the world to the brink of nuclear war; astronaut John Glenn becomes the first American to orbit the Earth aboard Friendship 7; actress Marilyn Monroe is found dead in Los Angeles; the 1962 FIFA World Cup in Chile sees Brazil defeat Czechoslovakia; the Sino-Indian War erupts along the Himalayan border; the Ole Miss riot of 1962 breaks out over James Meredith's enrollment; Telstar enables the first live transatlantic TV broadcast; the Évian Accords end the Algerian War, granting Algeria independence; and Wilt Chamberlain scores 100 points in a single NBA game.

1962 (MCMLXII) was a common year starting on Monday of the Gregorian calendar, the 1962nd year of the Common Era (CE) and Anno Domini (AD) designations, the 962nd year of the 2nd millennium, the 62nd year of the 20th century, and the 3rd year of the 1960s decade.

The year saw the Cuban Missile Crisis, the closest the world came to a nuclear confrontation during the Cold War. The major American retailers Walmart, Kmart, and Target all open their first stores, which would in decades to come, expand very rapidly.

== Events ==
=== January ===
- January 1 – Western Samoa becomes independent from New Zealand.
- January 3 – The office of Pope John XXIII announces the excommunication of Fidel Castro for preaching communism and interfering with Catholic churches in Cuba.
- January 8 – Harmelen train disaster: 93 die in the worst Dutch rail disaster.
- January 12 – The Indonesian Army confirms that it has begun operations in West Irian.
- January 13 – Albania allies itself with the People's Republic of China.
- January 15
  - Portugal abandons the United Nations General Assembly because of the debate over Angola.
  - French designer Yves Saint Laurent launches his own fashion house.
- January 16 – A military coup occurs in the Dominican Republic.
- January 19 – A counter-coup occurs in the Dominican Republic; the old government returns, except for the new president Rafael Filiberto Bonnelly.
- January 22 – The Organization of American States suspends Cuba's membership; the suspension is lifted in 2009 (47 years later).
- January 24 – The Organisation armée secrète (OAS, a right-wing paramilitary organization opposed to Algerian independence) bombs the French Foreign Ministry.
- January 26 – U.S. spacecraft Ranger 3 is launched to study the Moon; it later misses the Moon by 22,000 mi (35,000 km).
- January 27 – The Soviet government changes all place names honoring Molotov, Kaganovich and Georgy Malenkov.
- January 30 – Two of the high-wire "Flying Wallendas" are killed when their famous seven-person pyramid collapses during a performance in Detroit.

=== February ===
- February 3 – A United States embargo against Cuba is announced.
- February 4 – First successful winter ascent of the Matterhorn's north face, by Hilti von Allmen and Paul Etter, is completed.
- February 4–5 – During a new moon and solar eclipse, an extremely rare grand conjunction of the classical planets occurs (it includes all five of the naked-eye planets plus the Sun and Moon), all of them within 16° of one another on the ecliptic. The total solar eclipse of February 5, 1962 is visible in Asia, Australia and the Pacific Ocean, and is the 49th solar eclipse of Solar Saros 130.
- February 5 – President of France Charles de Gaulle calls for Algeria to be granted independence.
- February 7
  - The United States embargo against Cuba comes into effect, prohibiting all U.S.-related Cuban imports and exports.
  - Luisenthal Mine Disaster: A coal mine explosion in Saarland, West Germany, kills 299.
- February 10 – Captured American spy pilot Francis Gary Powers is exchanged for captured Soviet spy Rudolf Abel, in Berlin.
- February 11 – The inaugural 24 Hours of Daytona sports car endurance race is run as a 3-hour event, at Daytona Beach, Florida, United States.
- February 12 – Six members of the Committee of 100 of the Campaign for Nuclear Disarmament in the U.K. are found guilty of a breach of the Official Secrets Act.
- February 14 – First Lady Jacqueline Kennedy takes television viewers on a tour of the White House.
- February 15 – Urho Kekkonen is re-elected president of Finland.
- February 17 – Heavy storms and high tides result in the North Sea flood of 1962 on Germany's North Sea coast, mainly around Hamburg; more than 300 people die and thousands lose their homes.
- February 18 – 1962 NHRA Winternationals: Carol Cox becomes the first woman allowed to race at a National Hot Rod Association national event in the United States; she wins in the Super Stock class.
- February 20 – Project Mercury: Aboard Friendship 7, John Glenn becomes the first American to orbit the Earth, three times in 4 hours, 55 minutes.

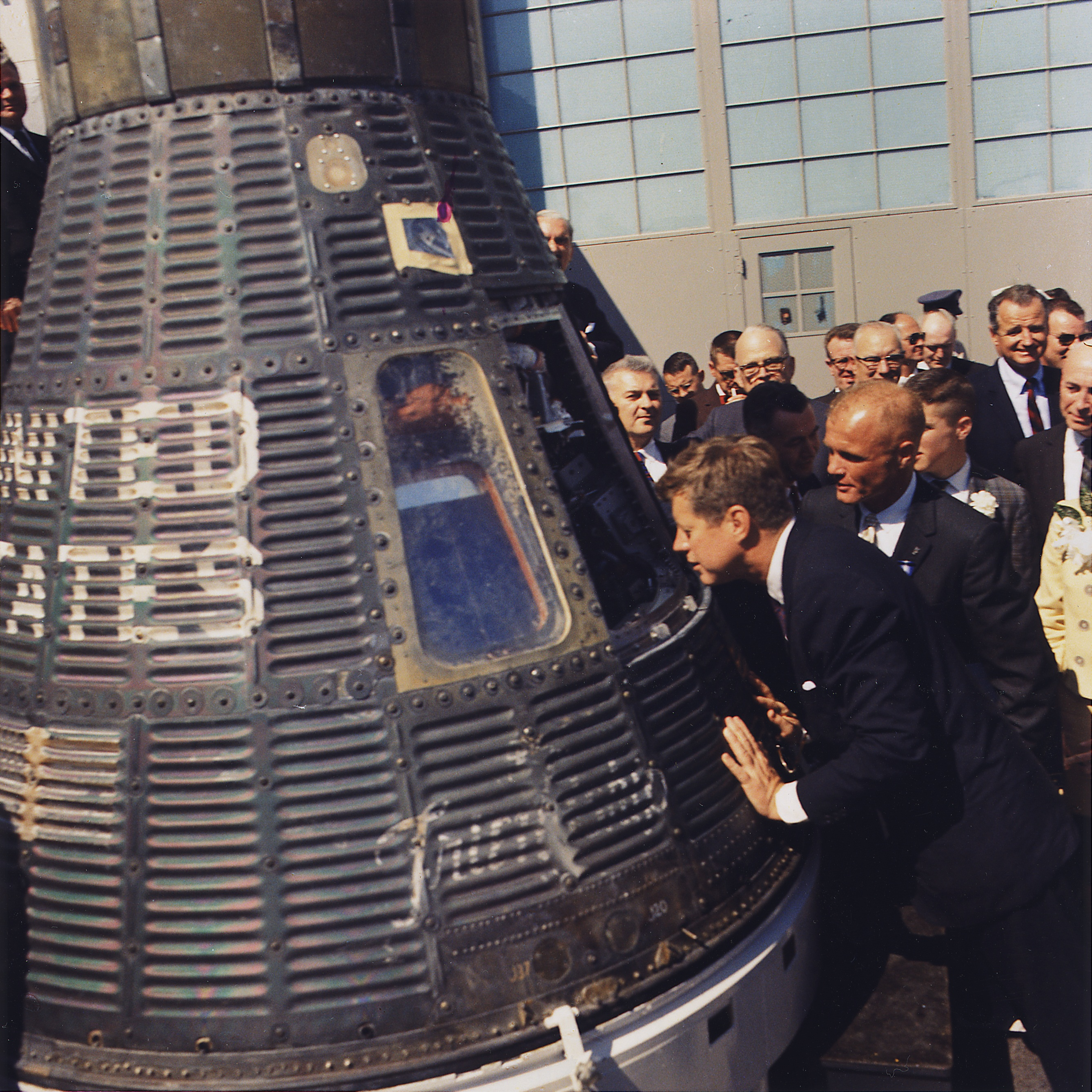
February 23 – Friendship 7 inspected by President Kennedy and astronaut John Glenn

=== March ===
- March–May – Yi–Ta incident: At least 60,000 Chinese citizens migrate from the People's Republic of China to the Soviet Union, predominantly (but not exclusively) ethnic Kazakhs.
- March 1 – American Airlines Flight 1 (a Boeing 707) crashes on takeoff at New York International Airport, after a rudder malfunction causes an uncontrolled roll, resulting in the loss of control of the aircraft, with the loss of all 95 on board.
- March 2 – A military coup in Burma brings General Ne Win to power.
- March 8–12 – In Geneva, France and the Algerian FLN begin negotiations.
- March 15 – Katangan Prime Minister Moise Tshombe begins negotiations to rejoin the Congo.
- March 16 – Flying Tiger Line Flight 739, a Lockheed L-1049H Super Constellation chartered by the United States Military Air Transport Service, and carrying mainly United States Army personnel bound for South Vietnam, vanishes over the western Pacific Ocean, with the loss of all 107 on board (no wreckage or bodies are ever found).
- March 18
  - Évian Accords: France and Algeria sign an agreement in Évian-les-Bains, ending the Algerian War.
  - "Un premier amour", sung by Isabelle Aubret (music by Claude-Henri Vic, lyrics by Roland Stephane Valade), wins the Eurovision Song Contest 1962 (staged in Luxembourg) for France.
- March 19 – An armistice begins in Algeria; however, the OAS continues its terrorist attacks against Algerians.
- March 23 – The Scandinavian States of the Nordic Council sign the Helsinki Convention on Nordic Co-operation.
- March 24 – OAS leader Edmond Jouhaud is arrested in Oran.
- March 26 – France shortens the term for military service from 26 months to 18.

=== April ===
- April 3 – Jawaharlal Nehru is elected de facto Prime Minister of India, for the fourth time.
- April 6 – Belgium reestablishes diplomatic relations with the Congo.
- April 7 – Milovan Đilas, author and former vice-president of Yugoslavia is re-arrested.
- April 8 – In France, the Évian Accords are adopted in a referendum, with a majority of 90%.
- April 9 – The 34th Academy Awards Ceremony is held in the United States; West Side Story wins Best Picture.
- April 13 – OAS leader Edmond Jouhaud is sentenced to death in France.
- April 14 – A Cuban military tribunal convicts 1,179 Bay of Pigs attackers.
- April 18 – The Commonwealth Immigrants Act in the United Kingdom removes free immigration from the citizens of member states of the Commonwealth of Nations, requiring proof of employment in the U.K. This comes into effect on 1 July.
- April 20 – OAS leader Raoul Salan is arrested in Algiers.
- April 21 – The Century 21 Exposition World's Fair opens in Seattle, United States. This is also the Opening Day of the Seattle Space Needle.
- April 26 – The U.S. Ranger 4 spacecraft crashes into the far side of the Moon without returning any scientific data.

=== May ===
- May 1
  - Norwich City F.C. wins the English Football League Cup, beating Rochdale in the final.
  - Dayton Hudson Corporation opens the first of its Target discount stores, in Roseville, Minnesota.
- May 2
  - An OAS bomb explodes in Algeria; this and other attacks kill 110 and injure 147.
  - S.L. Benfica beats Real Madrid 5–3 at the Olympic Stadium in Amsterdam to win the 1961–62 European Cup in association football.
- May 3 – Mikawashima train crash: 160 die in a triple-train disaster near Tokyo.
- May 5 – Twelve East Germans escape to the West via a tunnel under the Berlin Wall.
- May 6
  - Antonio Segni is elected President of the Italian Republic.
  - A test of a W47 warhead fired from a Polaris missile – the only time a nuclear missile has been test fired with its warhead detonated – occurs near Palmyra Atoll south of Hawaii.
- May 14
  - Juan Carlos of Spain marries the Greek Princess Sophia in Athens.
  - Milovan Đilas is given a further sentence in Yugoslavia, for publishing Conversations with Stalin.
- May 22 – Continental Airlines Flight 11 crashes near Unionville, Missouri, after the in-flight detonation of a bomb near the rear lavatory in a suicide bombing committed as insurance fraud; all 45 passengers and crew aboard are killed.
- May 23
  - Raoul Salan, founder of the French terrorist Organisation armée secrète, is sentenced to life imprisonment in France.
  - Ruben Jaramillo, Mexican peasant leader, and his wife and children, are gunned down by the Mexican army and federal police in Xochitepec, Morelos, Mexico.
- May 24 – Project Mercury: Scott Carpenter orbits the Earth 3 times, in the U.S. Aurora 7 space capsule.
- May 25 – The new Coventry Cathedral is consecrated in England. On 30 May, Benjamin Britten's War Requiem is premiered here.
- May 29 – Negotiations between the OAS and the FLA lead to a real armistice in Algeria.
- May 30 – The 1962 FIFA World Cup begins in Chile.
- May 31 – The British West Indies Federation is officially wound up (under terms of the U.K. West Indies Act of 18 April) due to internal dissention.

=== June ===
- June 3 – Air France Flight 007 (a Boeing 707) crashes on take-off at Orly Airport in Paris; 130 of 132 people on board are killed, 2 flight attendants survive. Most victims are cultural and civic leaders of Atlanta.
- June 11 – U.S. President John F. Kennedy gives the commencement address at Yale University.
- June 12 – Alcatraz escape attempt: Frank Morris, John Anglin and Clarence Anglin escape from the Alcatraz Island prison in the United States; it is never confirmed that they make it ashore.
- June 15 – Students for a Democratic Society in the United States complete the Port Huron Statement.
- June 17
  - The OAS signs a truce with the FLN in Algeria, but a day later announces that it will continue the fight on behalf of French Algerians.
  - Brazil beats Czechoslovakia 3–1, to win the 1962 FIFA World Cup.
- June 22 – Air France Flight 117 (a Boeing 707 jet) crashes into terrain during bad weather in Guadeloupe in the West Indies, killing all 113 on board, the airline's second fatal accident in just 3 weeks, and the third fatal 707 crash of the year.
- June 25
  - Engel v. Vitale: The United States Supreme Court rules that mandatory prayers in public schools are unconstitutional.
  - MANual Enterprises v. Day: The United States Supreme Court rules that photographs of nude men are not obscene, decriminalizing nude male pornographic magazines.
  - İsmet İnönü of the CHP forms the new government of Turkey (27th government, coalition partners; YTP and CKMP).
- June 26 – A 2-day steel strike begins in Italy in support of increased wages and a five-day working week.
- June 30 – The last soldiers of the French Foreign Legion leave Algeria.

=== July ===
- July 1
  - Rwanda and Burundi gain full independence from Belgium.
  - 1962 Algerian independence referendum in French Algeria: Supporters of Algerian independence win a 99% majority in a referendum.
  - A heavy smog develops over London.
  - The Helsinki Convention on Nordic Co-operation of March 23 comes into force in the Nordic countries.
- July 2 – Charles de Gaulle accepts Algerian independence; the French government recognizes it the next day.
- July 5 – Algeria becomes independent from France.
- July 10 – AT&T's Telstar, the world's first commercial communications satellite, is launched into orbit and activated the next day.
- July 12 – The Rolling Stones make their debut at London's Marquee Club, opening for Long John Baldry.
- July 13 – In what the press dubs the "Night of the Long Knives", United Kingdom Prime Minister Harold Macmillan dismisses one-third of his Cabinet.
- July 14 – Norma Nolan of Argentina is crowned Miss Universe 1962.
- July 17 – Nuclear testing: The "Small Boy" test shot Little Feller I becomes the last atmospheric test detonation, at the Nevada Test Site.
- July 19 – The first annual Swiss & Wielder Hoop and Stick Tournament is held.
- July 20 – France and Tunisia reestablish diplomatic relations.
- July 22 – Mariner program: The U.S. Mariner 1 spacecraft flies erratically several minutes after launch and has to be destroyed.
- July 23 – Telstar relays the first live trans-Atlantic television signal.
- July 25
  - The first attack helicopter company, Utility Tactical Transport Helicopter Company, of the United States Army is formed on Okinawa Island, Japan.
  - The International Agreement on the Neutrality of Laos is signed in Geneva.
- July 30 – Trans-Canada Highway officially opens throughout the 4,645-mile (7,475 km) between St. John's, Newfoundland, and Victoria, British Columbia, by completion of the Rogers Pass section, making it at this time the world's longest uninterrupted highway.
- July 31
  - Algeria proclaims independence; Ahmed Ben Bella is the first President.
  - Solar eclipse of July 31, 1962: An annular solar eclipse is visible in South America, the Atlantic Ocean, Africa and the Indian Ocean, and is the 36th solar eclipse of Solar Saros 135.

=== August ===
- August 5
  - Death of Marilyn Monroe: Actress Marilyn Monroe is found dead aged 36 from an overdose of sleeping pills and chloral hydrate at her home in Brentwood, Los Angeles; it is officially ruled a "probable suicide" (the exact cause has been disputed).
  - Anti-apartheid activist Nelson Mandela is arrested by the South African government near Howick, and charged with incitement to rebellion. On November 7, he is sentenced to imprisonment.
- August 6 – The Caribbean island of Jamaica becomes independent of the United Kingdom's British Empire and is the first English speaking-sovereign country in the West Indies and is first part of the Commonwealth of Nations.
- August 11 – King Kong vs. Godzilla is released in Japan, becoming the first Godzilla and King Kong film in colour. It also becomes the 3rd film in both franchises.
- August 13 – First successful ascent of the Matterhorn's west face, by Renato Daguin and Giovanni Ottin.
- August 15 – The New York Agreement is signed, transferring the Dutch West New Guinea colony to Indonesia.
- August 16 – Algeria joins the Arab League.
- August 17 – East German border guards kill 18-year-old Peter Fechter as he attempts to cross the Berlin Wall into West Berlin, leading to mass protests on the Western side.
- August 18 – Norway launches its 1st sounding rocket, Ferdinand 1, from Andøya Space Center and becomes a space nation.
- August 22 – Petit-Clamart attack: An assassination attempt is made against French President Charles de Gaulle by machine-gunning his car in the Paris suburbs. The mastermind, Jean Bastien-Thiry, will later be executed.
- August 24 – Indonesia officially launches television with the establishment of TVRI television network or Televisi Republik Indonesia (Indonesian National Channel), broadcasting the opening of the 1962 Asian Games.
- August 27 – NASA launches the Mariner 2 space probe.
- August 31 – The Caribbean island nation of Trinidad and Tobago becomes fully independent of the United Kingdom's British Empire.

=== September ===
- September 1
  - A referendum in Singapore supports the Malayan Federation.
  - Typhoon Wanda strikes Hong Kong, killing at least 130 and injuring more than 600.
- September 2 – The Soviet Union agrees to send arms to Cuba.
- September 8 – Newly independent Algeria, by referendum, adopts a constitution.
- September 12
  - President John F. Kennedy, in his "We choose to go to the Moon" speech at Rice University, reaffirms that the U.S. will put a man on the Moon by the end of the decade.
  - The first Kohl's department store chain is opened in Brookfield, Wisconsin.
- September 19 – Atlantic College opens its doors for the first time in Wales, marking the birth of the pioneering United World College educational movement.
- September 22 – Bob Dylan premieres his song "A Hard Rain's a-Gonna Fall", at Carnegie Hall in New York City.
- September 23 – Flying Tiger Line Flight 923, a Lockheed L-1049H Super Constellation registered as N6923C, ditched into the Atlantic Ocean killing 28 occupants out of 76 on board. The remaining 48 were rescued six hours later.
- September 26 – The North Yemen Civil War erupts.
- September 27 – A flash flood in Barcelona, Spain, kills more than 440 people.
- September 29 – The Canadian Alouette 1, the first satellite built outside the United States and the Soviet Union, is launched from Vandenberg Air Force Base in California.

=== October ===
- October 1 – The first black student at the University of Mississippi, James Meredith, is escorted by Federal Marshals to register, to protect him from official obstruction and violent segregationalist protest, the "Ole Miss riot of 1962".
- October 3 – Project Mercury: Mercury-Atlas 8 – U.S. astronaut Walter Schirra orbits the Earth six times, in the Sigma 7 space capsule.
- October 5 – The French National Assembly censures the proposed referendum to sanction presidential elections by popular mandate; Prime Minister Georges Pompidou resigns, but President de Gaulle asks him to stay in office.
- October 8
  - Spiegel affair: German magazine Der Spiegel publishes an article revealing NATO criticism of the Bundeswehr (West German defence forces)' poor preparedness; a political scandal erupts.
  - Algeria is accepted into the United Nations.
- October 9 – Uganda becomes independent of the U.K. within the Commonwealth of Nations.
- October 11 – Second Vatican Council: Pope John XXIII convenes the first ecumenical council of the Roman Catholic Church in 92 years.

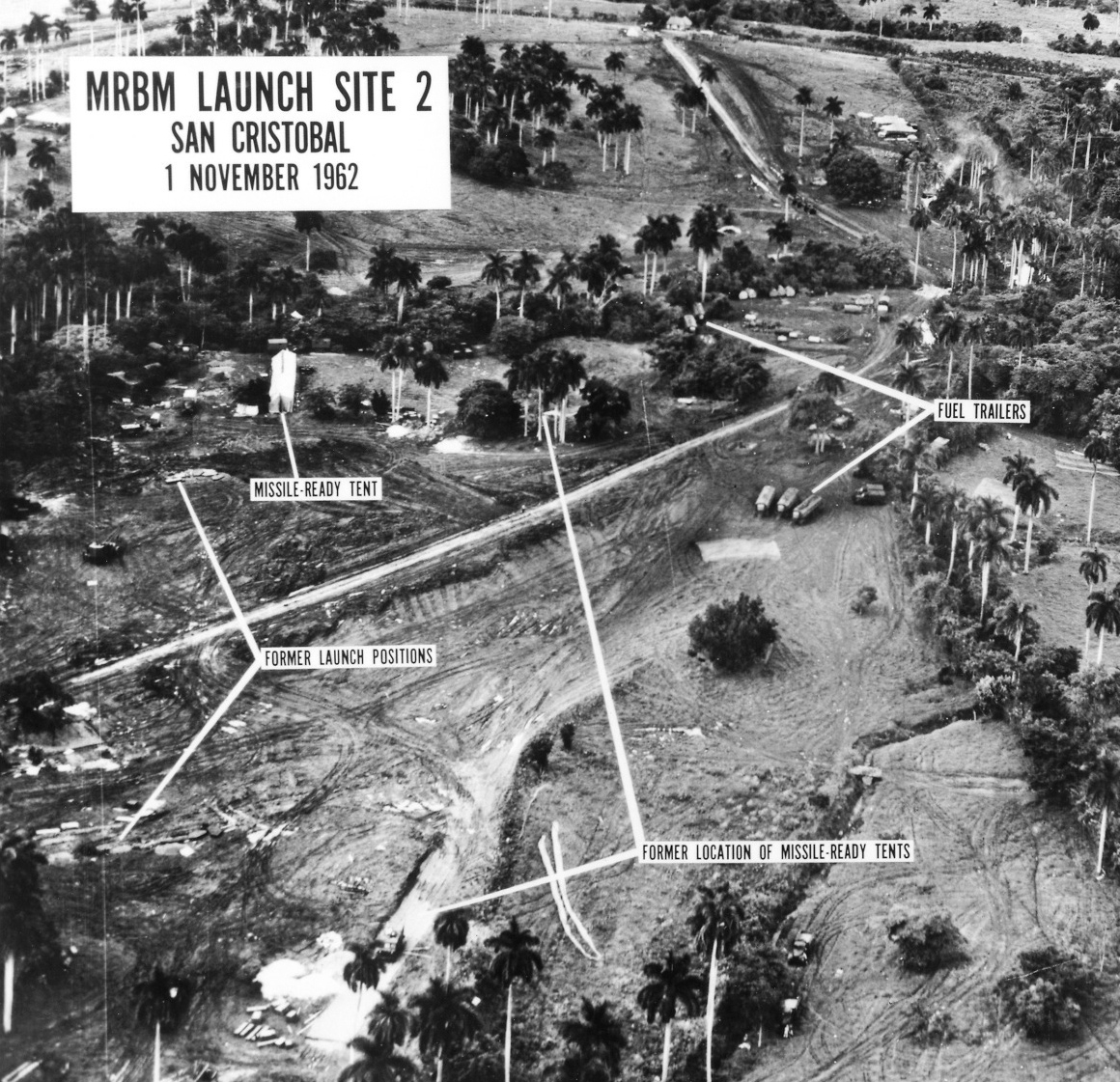
October 14 – Pictures of Soviet missile silos in Cuba, taken by U.S. spy planes

- October 16 – Cuban Missile Crisis begins when U.S. President Kennedy is told of photographs (taken from U-2 flights) showing Soviet nuclear weapon installations being constructed on Cuba in the Caribbean. A stand-off ensues for 12 days between the United States and the Soviet Union, threatening the world with nuclear war.
- October 20 – The Sino-Indian War, a border dispute involving two of the world's largest nations (India and the People's Republic of China), erupts into fighting.
- October 22
  - Cuban Missile Crisis: In a televised address, U.S. President John F. Kennedy announces the presence of Soviet missiles in Cuba and the U.S. naval blockade of the island.
  - John Vassall, a former clerical officer in British naval intelligence, is sentenced to 18 years imprisonment after admitting to passing secret material to the Soviet Union.
- October 24 – Cuban Missile Crisis: The first confrontation occurs between the U.S. Navy and a Soviet cargo vessel; the vessel changes course.
- October 26 – Spiegel affair: German police occupy the offices of Der Spiegel in Hamburg.
- October 27 – Cuban Missile Crisis: Vasily Arkhipov, executive officer of Soviet submarine B-59, refuses to launch nuclear torpedoes against the U.S. Navy. This event is widely regarded as crucial in averting a worldwide nuclear war.
- October 28
  - Cuban Missile Crisis ends: Soviet Union leader Nikita Khrushchev announces that he has ordered the removal of Soviet missile bases in Cuba. In a secret deal between Kennedy and Khrushchev, Kennedy agrees to the withdrawal of U.S. missiles from Turkey. The fact that this deal is not made public makes it look as though the Soviets have backed down.
  - A referendum in France favors the election of the president by universal suffrage.
- October 31 – The United Nations General Assembly asks the United Kingdom to suspend enforcement of the new constitution in Southern Rhodesia (modern-day Zimbabwe), but it comes into effect on November 1.

=== November ===
- November
  - Aleksandr Solzhenitsyn's novella One Day in the Life of Ivan Denisovich (Russian: Оди́н день Ива́на Дени́совича, Odin den' Ivana Denisovicha), the author's pseudo-autobiographical account of life in the gulag, is published in Novy Mir, in an unprecedented acknowledgement of the Soviet Union's Stalinist past.
  - Slavery in Saudi Arabia is abolished.
- November 1
  - The Soviet Union begins dismantling its missiles in Cuba.
  - The comic book antihero Diabolik first appears in Italy.
- November 2 – Greville Wynne, a British trader acting as a courier for MI6, is arrested by the KGB in Budapest and imprisoned in Moscow after confessing to espionage.
- November 3 – Earliest recorded use of the term "personal computer", in the report of a speech by computing pioneer John Mauchly in The New York Times.
- November 5
  - West German defense minister Franz Josef Strauß is relieved of his duties over the Spiegel affair due to his alleged involvement in police action against the magazine.
  - Saudi Arabia breaks off diplomatic relations with Egypt following a period of unrest, partly caused by the defection of several Saudi princes to Egypt.
  - A coal mining disaster in Ny-Ålesund kills 21 people; the Norwegian government is forced to resign in the aftermath of this accident, in August 1963.
- November 6 – Apartheid: The United Nations General Assembly passes a resolution condemning South Africa's racist apartheid policies and calls for all UN member states to cease military and economic relations with the nation.
- November 17 – Dulles International Airport, in Washington, D.C., is dedicated by President John F. Kennedy.
- November 20 – Cuban Missile Crisis: In response to the Soviet Union agreeing to remove its missiles from Cuba, President John F. Kennedy ends the blockade of the island.
- November 21 – The Sino-Indian War ends with a Chinese victory with India surrendering Aksai Chin to China.
- November 24 – The first episode of That Was the Week That Was, the groundbreaking satirical comedy program hosted by David Frost, is broadcast on BBC Television in the United Kingdom.
- November 25 – The 1962 Bavarian state election is held.
- November 26
  - Spiegel affair: German police end their occupation of the offices of Der Spiegel.
  - Mies Bouwman starts presenting the first live TV-marathon fundraising show (Open Het Dorp in the Netherlands), which lasts 23 hours non-stop.
- November 27 – French President Charles De Gaulle orders Georges Pompidou to form a government.
- November 29 – An agreement is signed between Britain and France, to develop the Concorde supersonic airliner.
- November 30 – The United Nations General Assembly elects U Thant of Burma, as the new Secretary-General of the United Nations.

=== December ===
- December 2 – Vietnam War: After a trip to Vietnam at the request of U.S. President John F. Kennedy, U.S. Senate Majority Leader Mike Mansfield becomes the first American official to make a pessimistic public comment on the war's progress.
- December 7 – Rainier III, Prince of Monaco revises the principality's constitution, devolving some of his formerly autocratic power to several advisory and legislative councils.
- December 8
  - The first period of the Second Vatican Council closes.
  - The North Kalimantan National Army revolts in Brunei, in the first stirrings of the Indonesian Confrontation.
  - The 1962–63 New York City newspaper strike begins, affecting all of the city's major newspapers; it will last for 114 days.
  - Queen Wilhelmina of the Netherlands, who died on November 28, is buried at the Nieuwe Kerk (Delft).
- December 9 – Tanganyika (modern-day Tanzania) becomes a republic within the Commonwealth of Nations, with Julius Nyerere as president.
- December 11
  - In West Germany, a coalition government of Christian Democrats, Christian Socialists and Free Democrats is formed.
  - The last execution by hanging is carried out in Canada.
- December 14
  - U.S. spacecraft Mariner 2 passes by Venus, becoming the first spacecraft to transmit data from another planet.
  - Leonardo da Vinci's early 16th-century painting the Mona Lisa is assessed for insurance purposes at US$100 million before touring the United States for several months, the highest insurance value for a painting in history. However, the Louvre, its owner, chooses to spend the money that would have been spent on the insurance premium on security instead.
- December 15 – Storm over the North Sea: Belgian pirate radio station Radio Uylenspiegel is knocked off the airwaves, never to operate again.
- December 19 – Britain acknowledges the right of Nyasaland (modern-day Malawi) to secede from the Central African Federation.
- December 24 – Cuba releases the last 1,113 participants in the Bay of Pigs Invasion to the U.S., in exchange for food worth $53 million.
- December 30
  - United Nations troops occupy the last rebel positions in Katanga; Moise Tshombe moves to South Rhodesia.
  - An unexpected storm buries Maine under five feet of snow, forcing the Bangor Daily News to miss a publication date for the only time in history. The same day, also, the Netherlands are covered with several feet of snow.

=== Undated ===
- Around 20,000 Harkis, indigenous Muslim Algerians who fought as auxiliary soldiers on the French side in the Algerian War, with their families flee Algeria for metropolitan France fearing unofficial reprisals in their home country.
- The laser diode is invented.
- Slavery in Yemen is abolished.

=== Ongoing ===
- 1962–1965 rubella epidemic, originating in Europe and spreading to the United States.

== Births ==
=== January ===
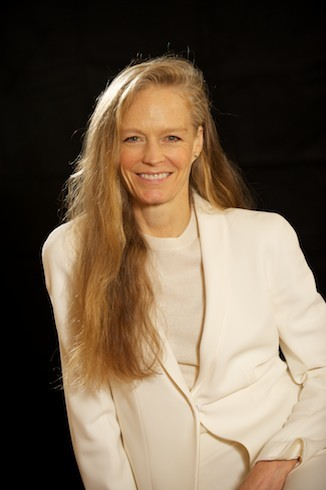
Suzy Amis Cameron

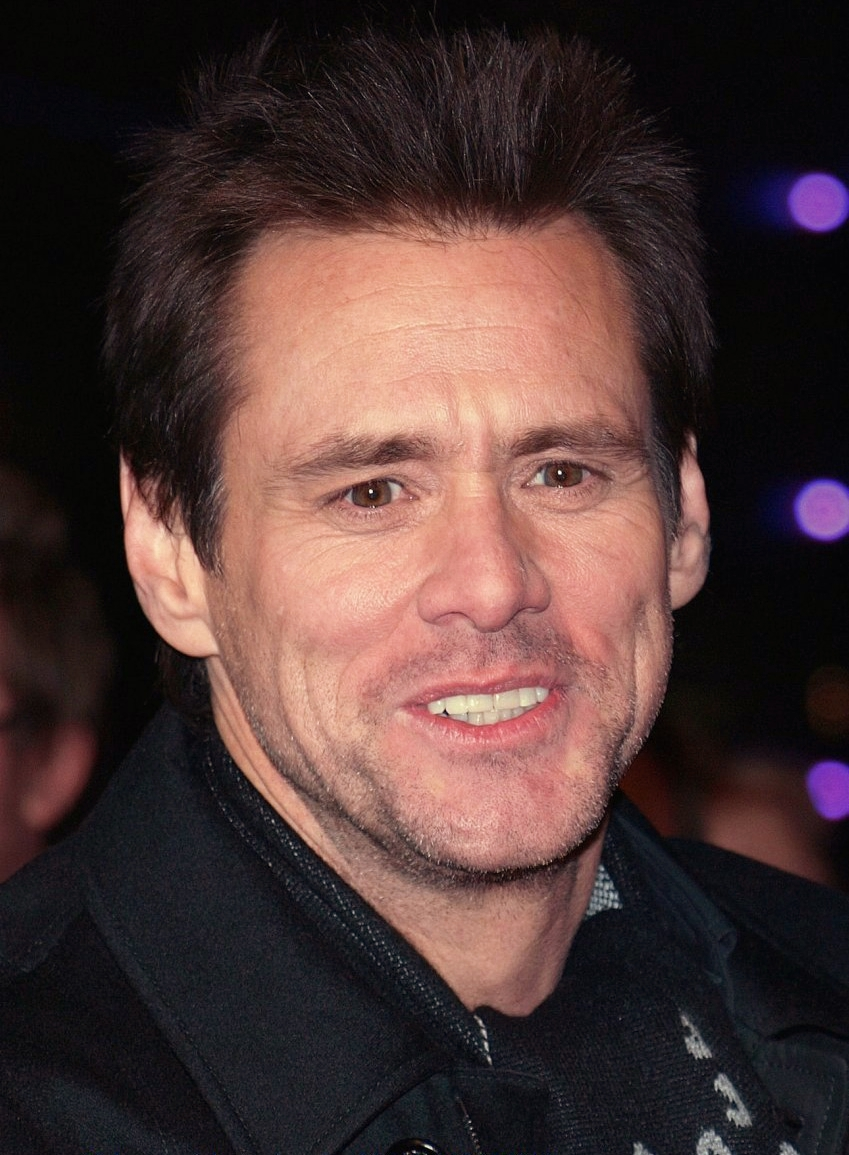
Jim Carrey

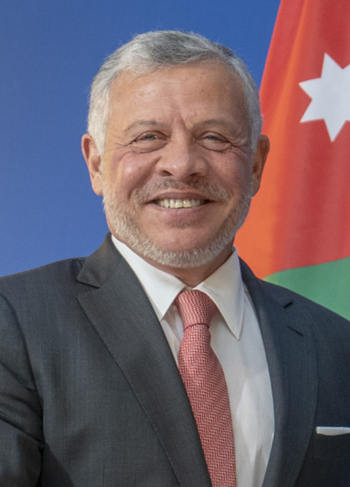
Abdullah II of Jordan

- January 3 – Ginette Amara, Central African academician, veterinarian and politician.
- January 4
  - Laila Elwi, Egyptian actress
  - Peter Steele, American musician (Type O Negative) (d. 2010)
  - Natalya Bochina, Russian athlete
- January 5 – Suzy Amis Cameron, American actress and model
- January 7
  - Ron Rivera, American football player and coach
  - Hallie Todd, American actress, producer and writer
- January 8 – Paraguayo Cubas, Paraguayan politician
- January 9 – Cecilia Gabriela, Mexican actress
- January 17
  - Jim Carrey, Canadian actor and comedian
  - Karl Davis, African-American fashion designer (d. 1987)
  - Denis O'Hare, American-Irish actor
- January 21
  - Tyler Cowen, American economist
  - Marie Trintignant, French actress (d. 2003)
- January 22
  - Lyudmila Dzhigalova, Russian athlete
  - Mizan Zainal Abidin of Terengganu, Yang di-Pertuan Agong of Malaysia
- January 23
  - Stephen Keshi, Nigerian footballer and manager (d. 2016)
  - Richard Roxburgh, Australian actor
- January 25 – Chris Chelios, American ice hockey player
- January 29 – Olga Tokarczuk, Polish novelist, Nobel Prize laureate
- January 30
  - King Abdullah II of Jordan
  - Mary Kay Letourneau, American child rapist (d. 2020)

=== February ===
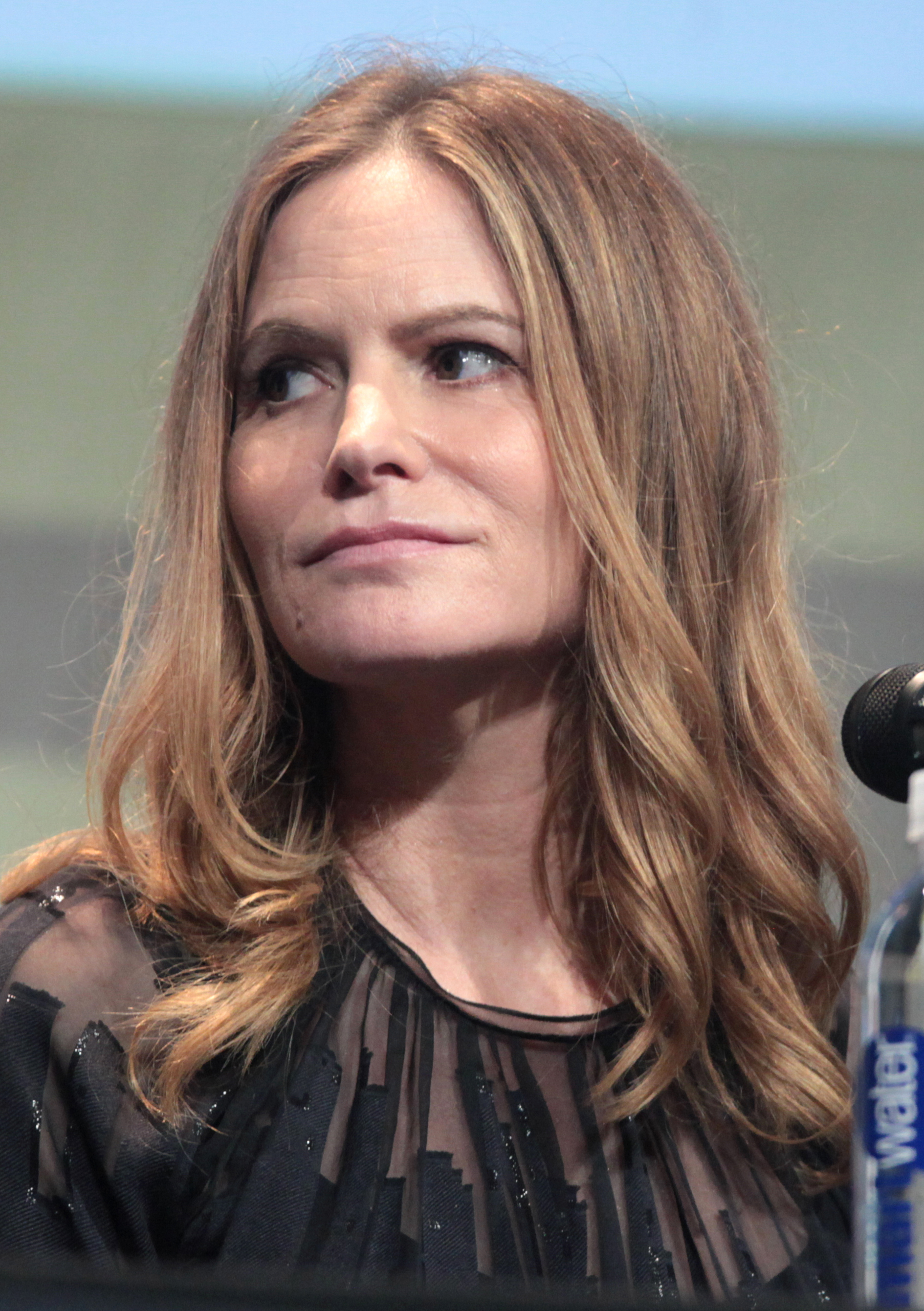
Jennifer Jason Leigh

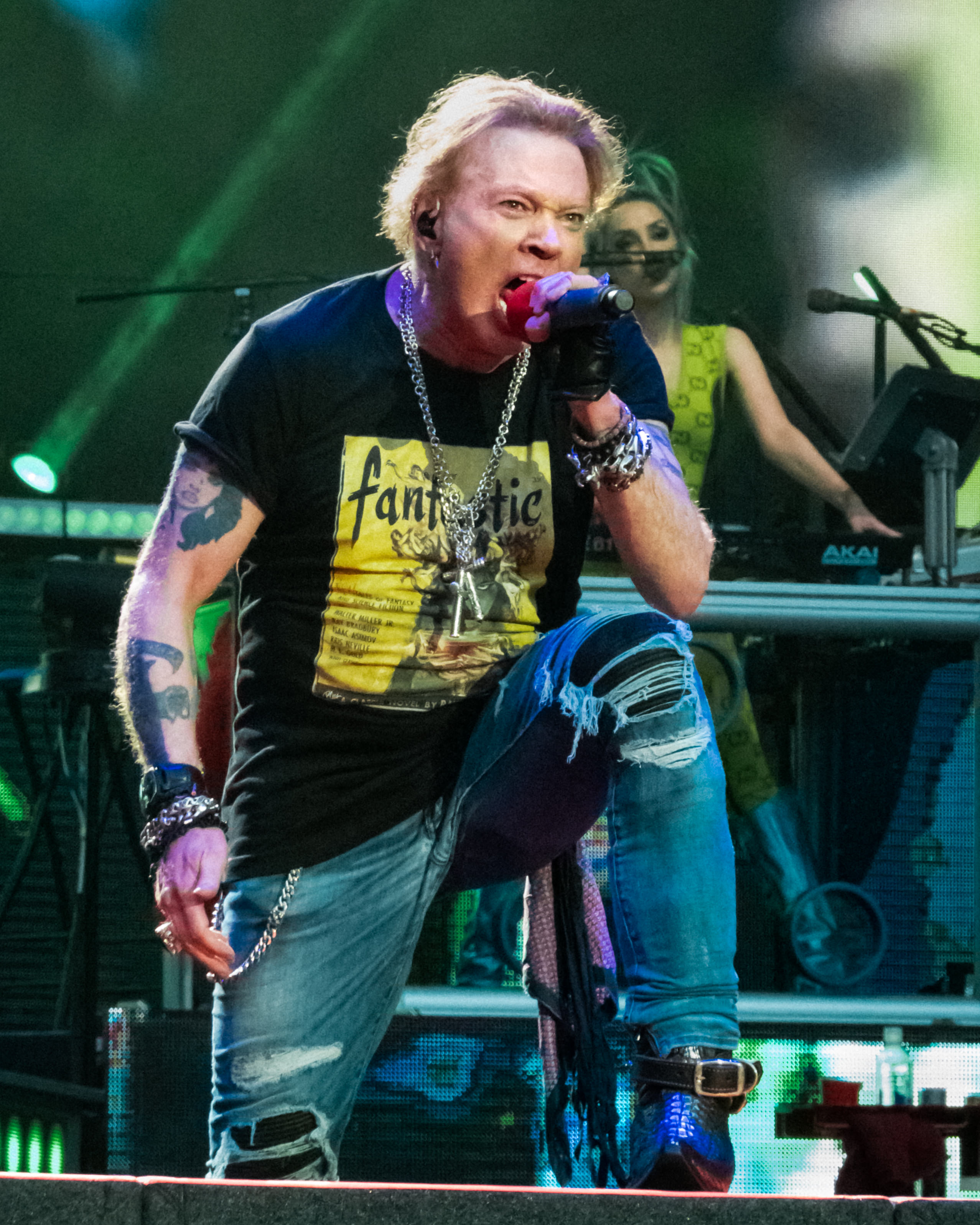
Axl Rose

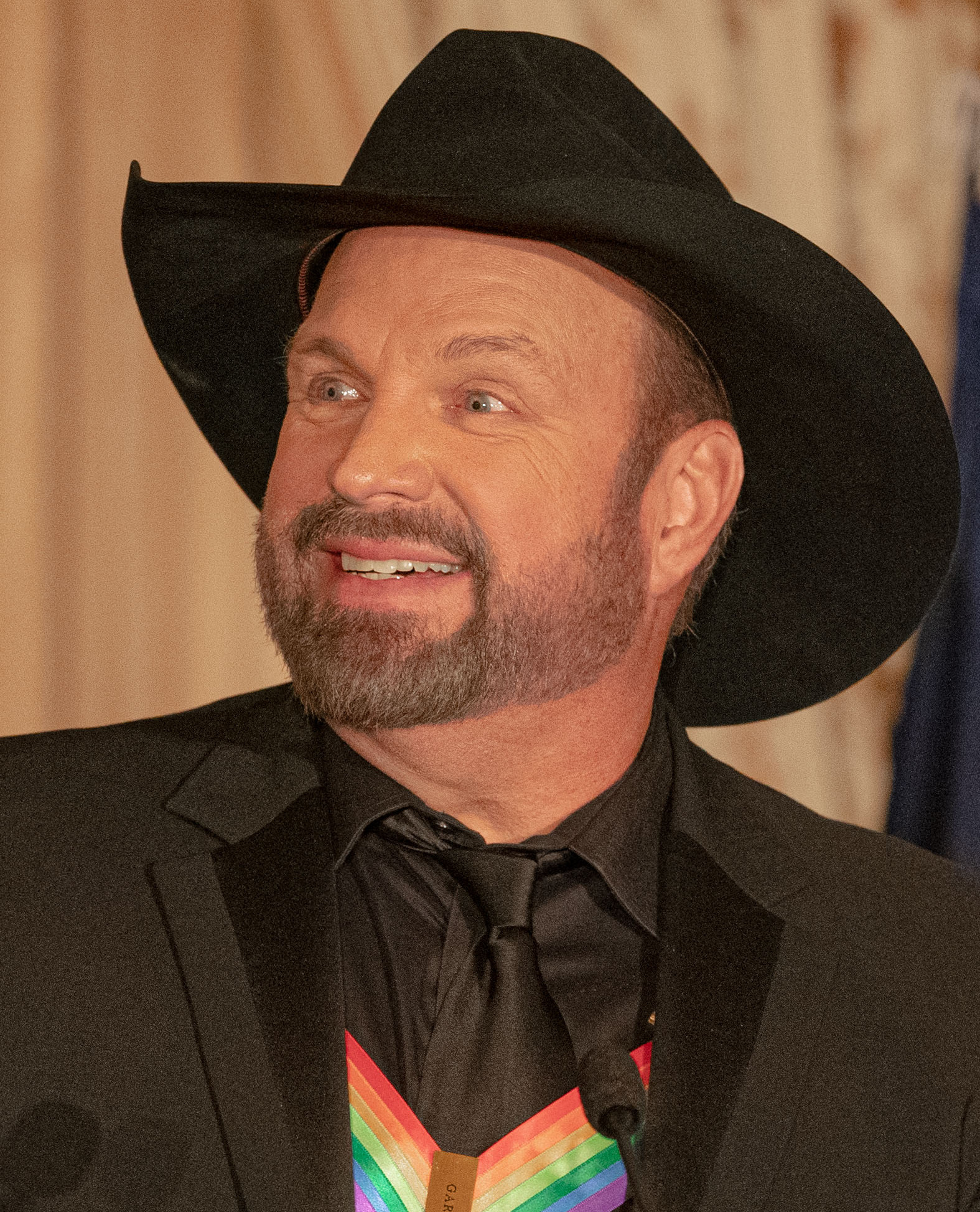
Garth Brooks

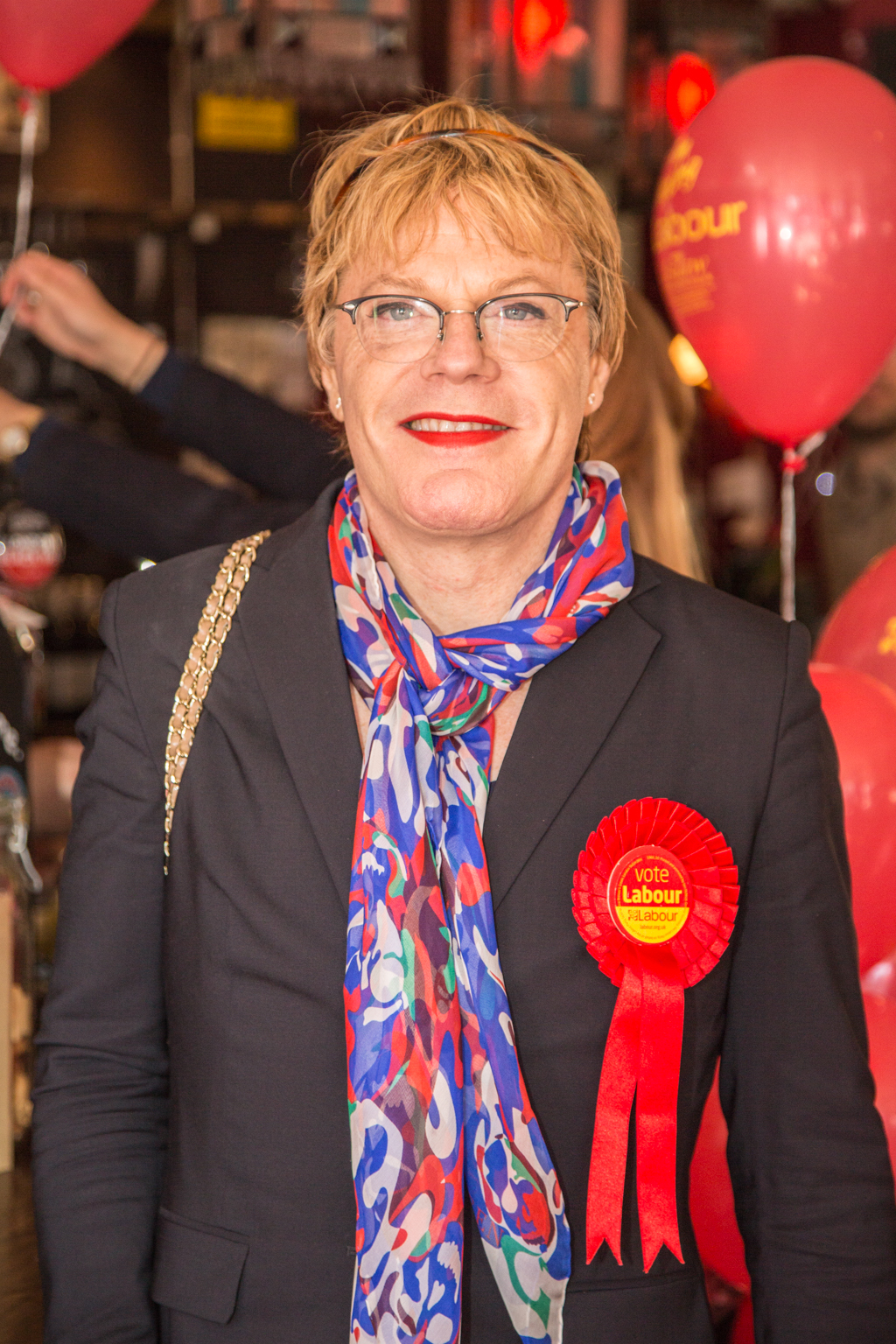
Eddie Izzard

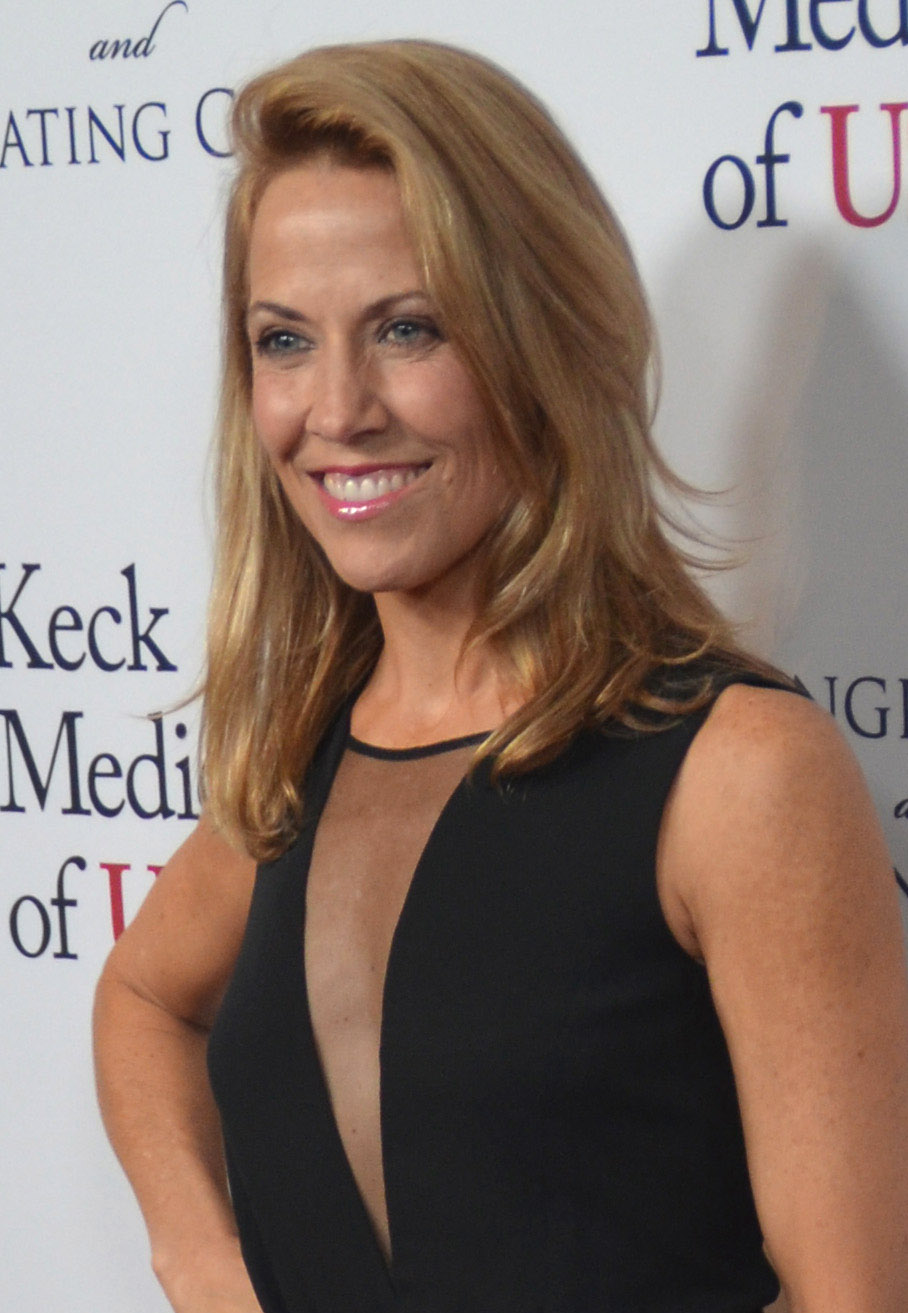
Sheryl Crow

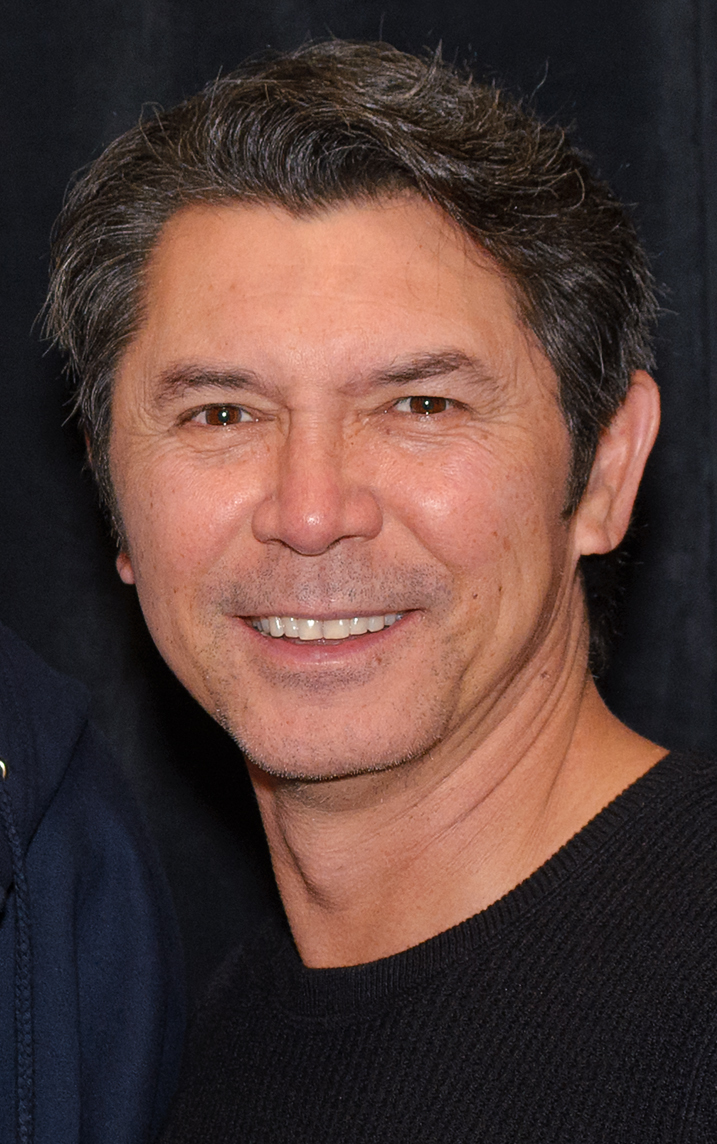
Lou Diamond Phillips

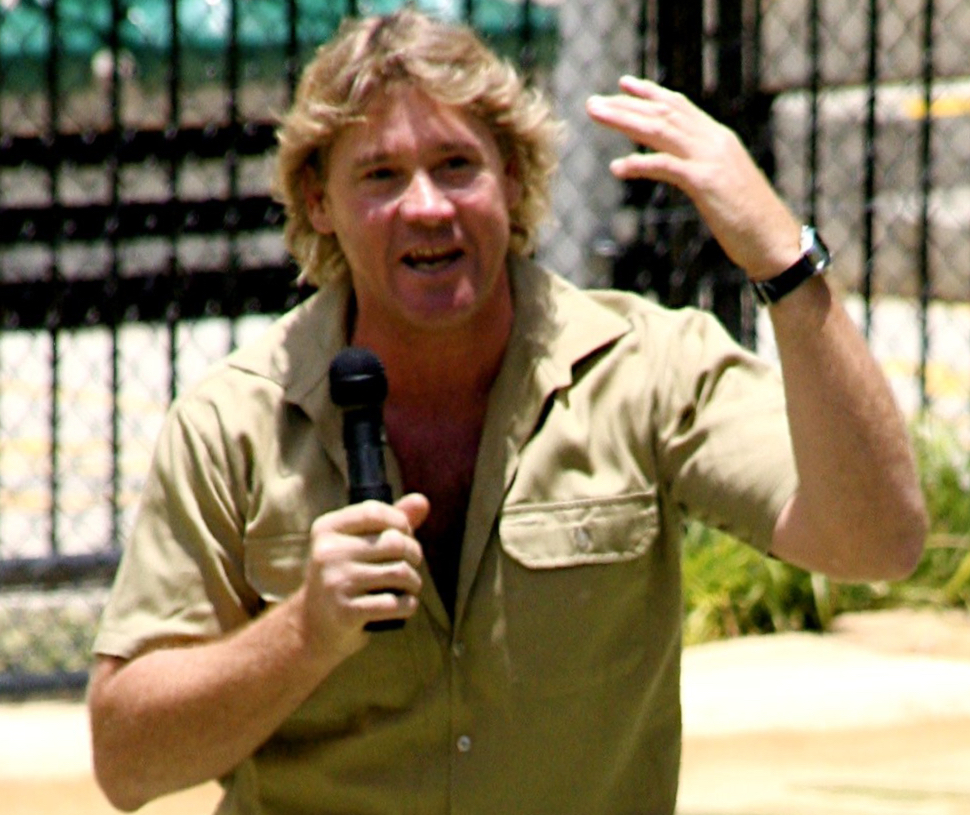
Steve Irwin

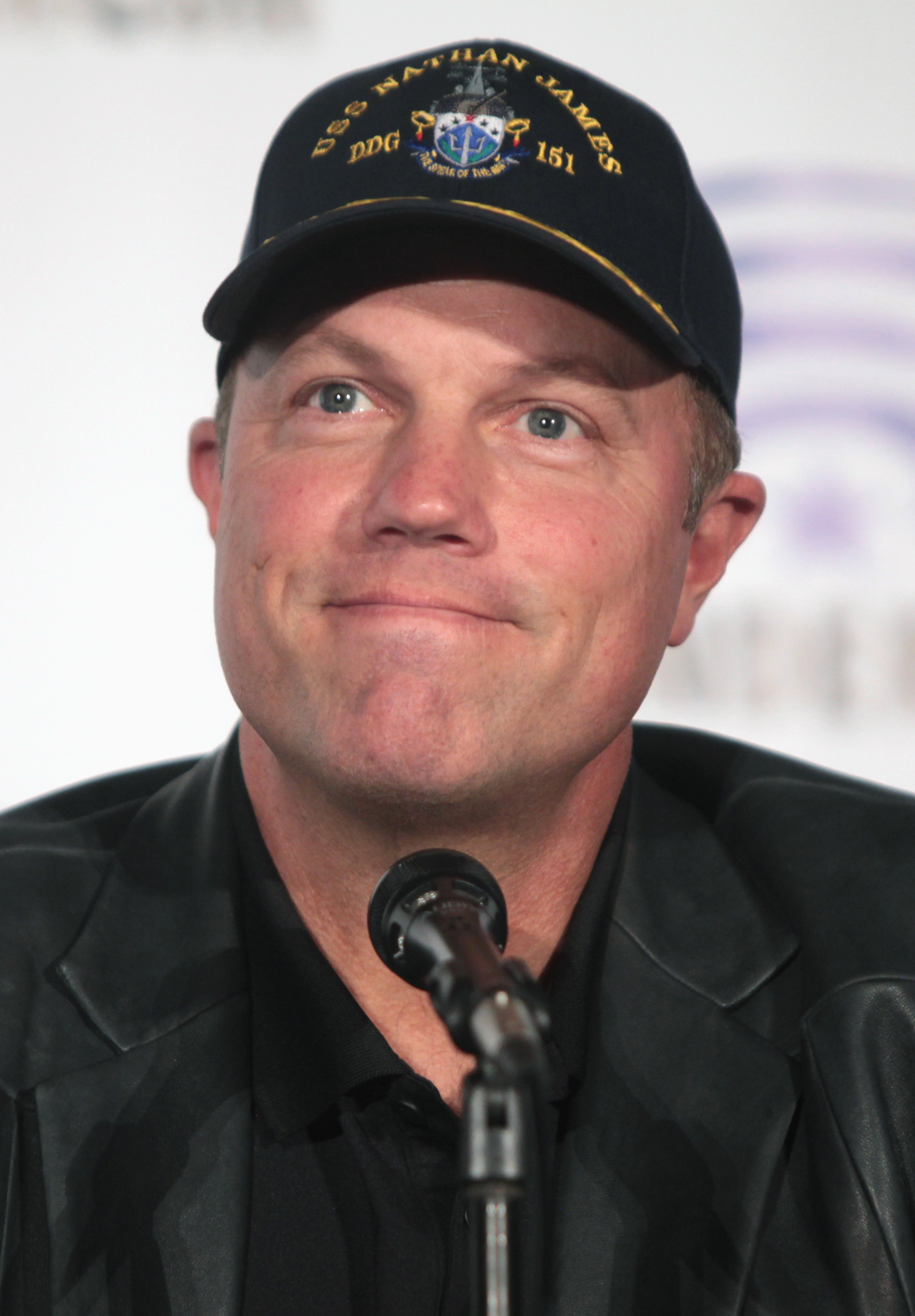
Adam Baldwin

- February 1 – Takashi Murakami, Japanese pop artist
- February 2 – Kátia Abreu, Brazilian politician
- February 5
  - Jennifer Jason Leigh, American actress
  - Martin Nievera, Filipino singer
- February 6 – Axl Rose, American musician, singer-songwriter of Guns N' Roses
- February 7
  - Garth Brooks, American singer-songwriter
  - David Bryan, American musician (Bon Jovi)
  - Eddie Izzard, British actor and comedian
- February 8 – Malorie Blackman, British author of young adult fiction
- February 9
  - Lolo Ferrari, French actress (d. 2000)
  - Zoë Lund, American musician, model, actress, author, producer, political activist and screenwriter (d. 1999)
  - Dennis Padilla, Filipino comedian, TV host, radio broadcaster and actor
  - Dany Roland, Argentine-born Brazilian drummer, sound designer, actor, film director and record producer
- February 10
  - Cliff Burton, American musician and songwriter (d. 1986)
  - Bobby Czyz, American boxer
- February 11 – Sheryl Crow, American singer-songwriter
- February 12
  - Nana Ioseliani, Georgian chess player
  - Jimmy Kirkwood, Irish field hockey player
- February 13
  - Michele Greene, American actress
  - Jackie Silva, Brazilian volleyball player
- February 14 – Ken Oosterbroek, South African photojournalist (d. 1994)
- February 15 – Srettha Thavisin, Thai businessman and politician, 30th Prime Minister of Thailand
- February 17
  - Alison Hargreaves, British mountain climber (d. 1995)
  - Lou Diamond Phillips, American actor
- February 19 – Nabila Khashoggi, American businesswoman, actress and philanthropist
- February 20 – Eduardo de Almeida Navarro, Brazilian philologist and lexicographer
- February 21
  - Vanessa Feltz, British television presenter
  - Chuck Palahniuk, American author
  - David Foster Wallace, American writer (d. 2008)
- February 22
  - Steve Irwin, Australian zookeeper, television personality, wildlife expert, environmentalist and conservationist (d. 2006)
  - Ethan Wayne, American actor
- February 25 – Birgit Fischer, German kayaker
- February 26 – Domingos Montagner, Brazilian actor, playwright and entrepreneur (d. 2016)
- February 27
  - Adam Baldwin, American actor
  - Grant Show, American actor
- February 28 – Angela Bailey, Canadian track and field athlete (d. 2021)

=== March ===
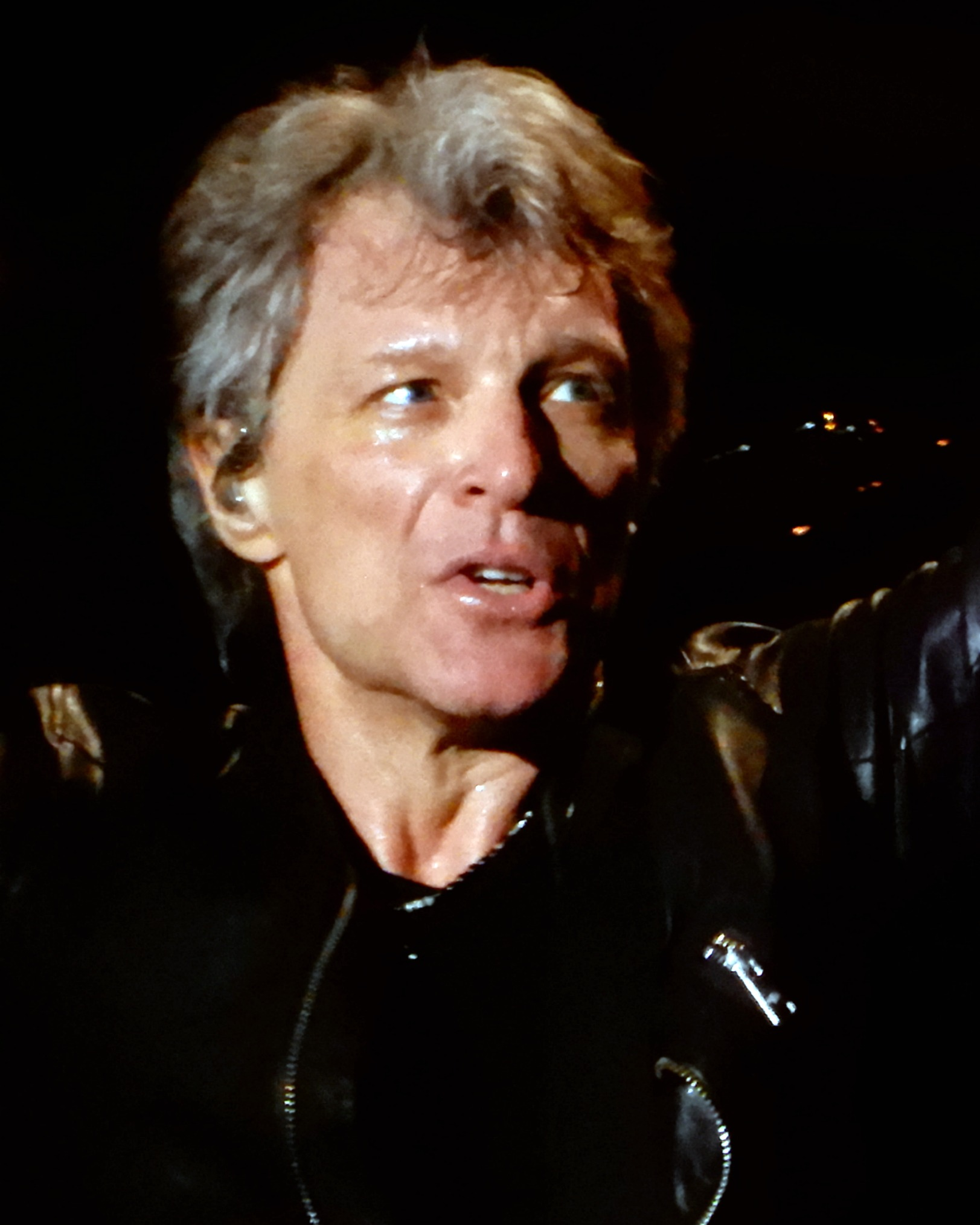
Jon Bon Jovi

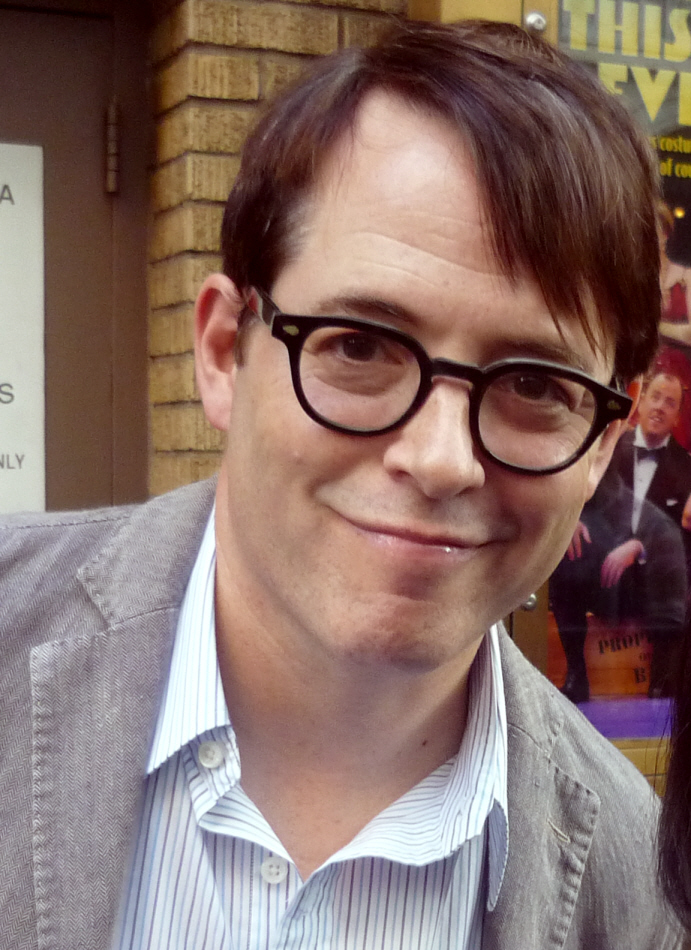
Matthew Broderick

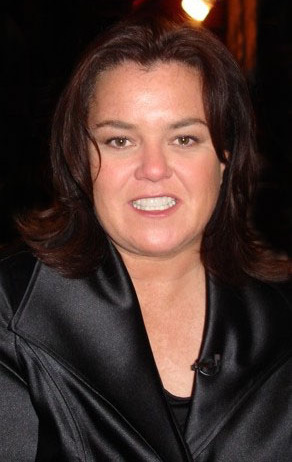
Rosie O'Donnell

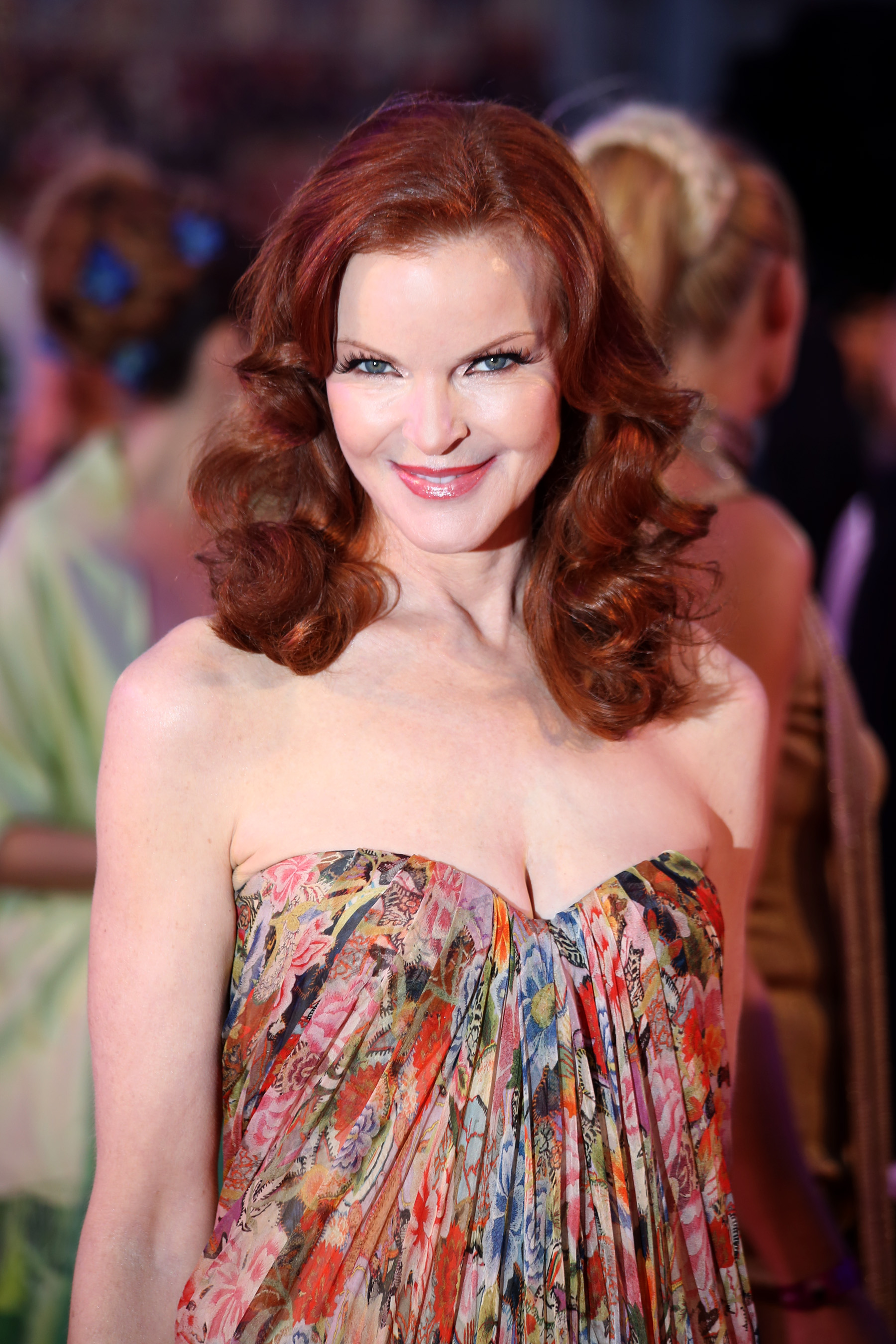
Marcia Cross

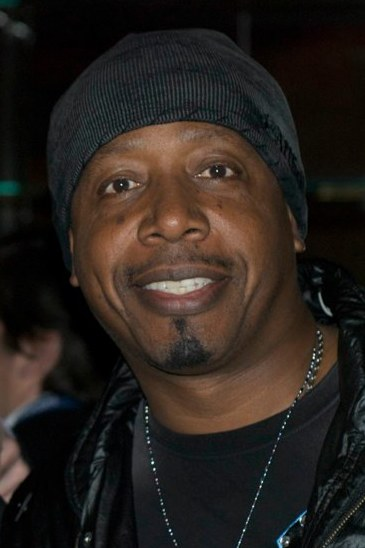
MC Hammer

- March 2
  - Jon Bon Jovi, American musician
  - Raimo Summanen, Finnish ice hockey player and coach
  - Scott La Rock, American disc jockey (d. 1987)
- March 3 – Jackie Joyner-Kersee, American athlete
- March 6
  - Rita Sargsyan, Armenian First Lady (d. 2020)
  - Erika Hess, Swiss alpine skier
- March 7 – Taylor Dayne, American singer-songwriter and actress
- March 10
  - Jasmine Guy, American actress, director, singer and dancer
  - Seiko Matsuda, Japanese pop singer-songwriter
- March 11 – Achmad Yurianto, Indonesian military doctor and bureaucrat (d. 2022)
- March 12
  - Julia Campbell, American actress
  - Laurent Castillo, French politician
- March 14 – Tsvetanka Khristova, Bulgarian athlete (d. 2008)
- March 16 – Branco Mello, Brazilian singer, actor and writer
- March 17 – Kalpana Chawla, American astronaut (d. 2003)
- March 19 – Iván Calderón, Puerto Rican Major League Baseball player (d. 2003)
- March 20 – Stephen Sommers, American film director
- March 21
  - Matthew Broderick, American actor and singer
  - Rosie O'Donnell, American comedian, actress, talk-show host and activist
- March 23
  - Bassel al-Assad, Syrian politician, engineer and equestrian (d. 1994)
  - Sir Steve Redgrave, English rower
- March 25
  - Fernando Martín Espina, Spanish basketball player (d. 1989)
  - Marcia Cross, American actress
- March 26 – John Stockton, American basketball player
- March 27 – Jann Arden, Canadian singer
- March 29 – Ted Failon, Filipino broadcast journalist and radio commentator
- March 30
  - Mark Begich, American politician
  - MC Hammer, American rapper and actor
  - Michael Rooney, American choreographer
  - Gary Stevens, English international footballer and manager

=== April ===
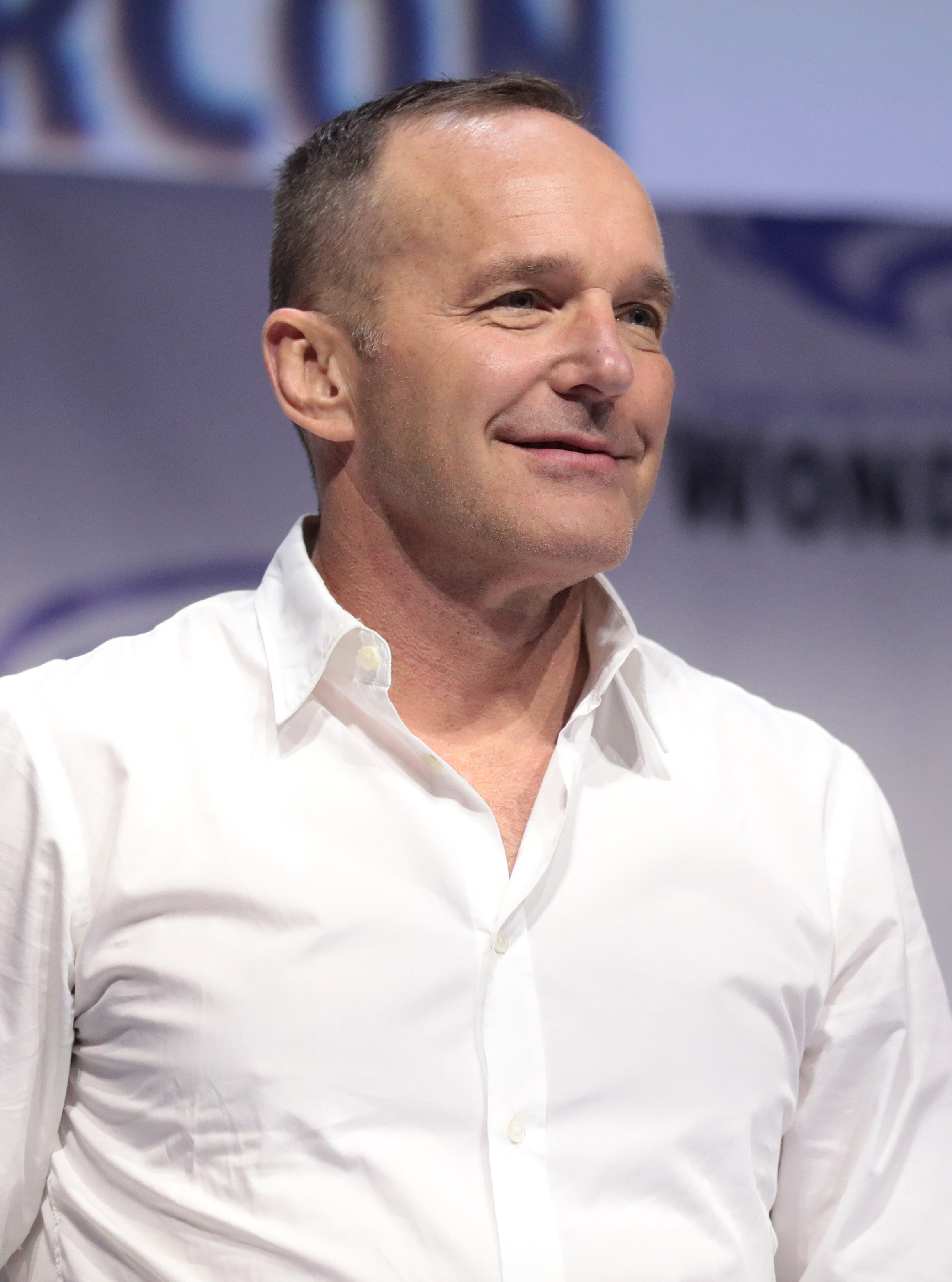
Clark Gregg

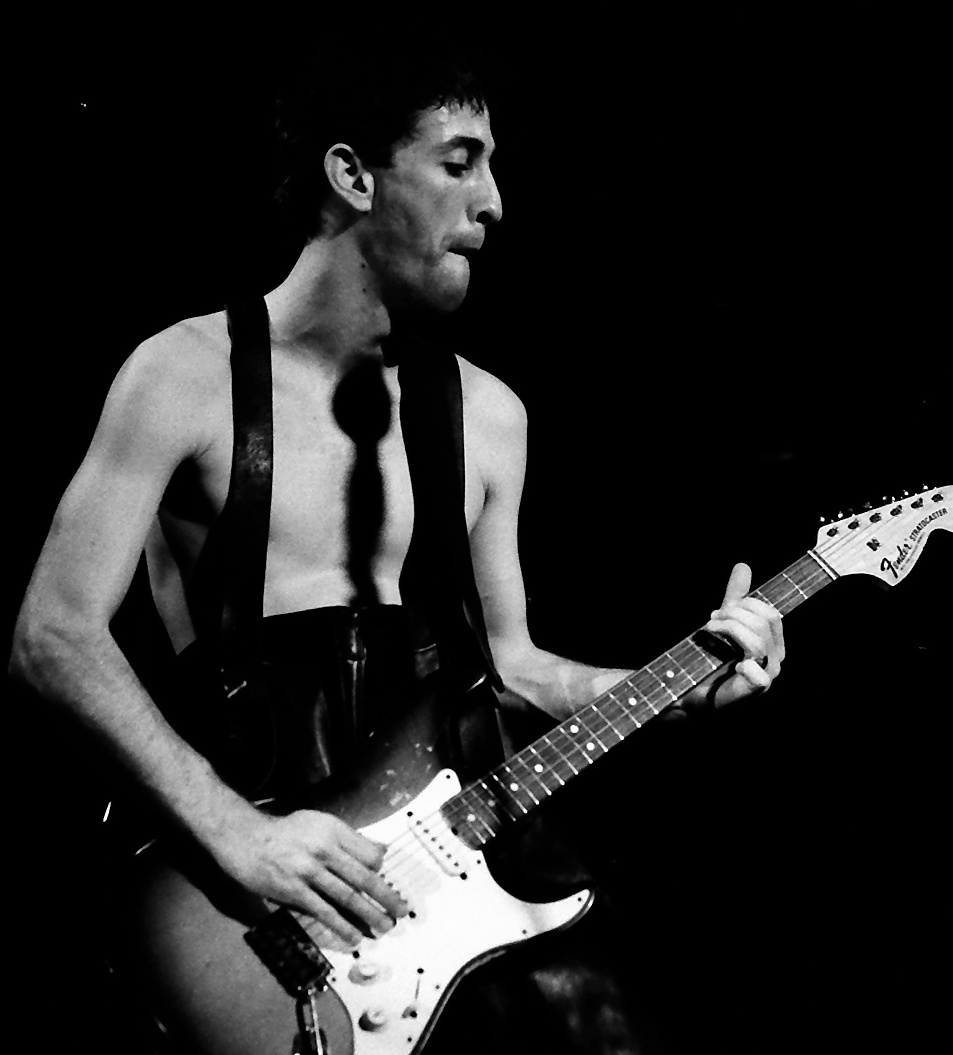
Hillel Slovak

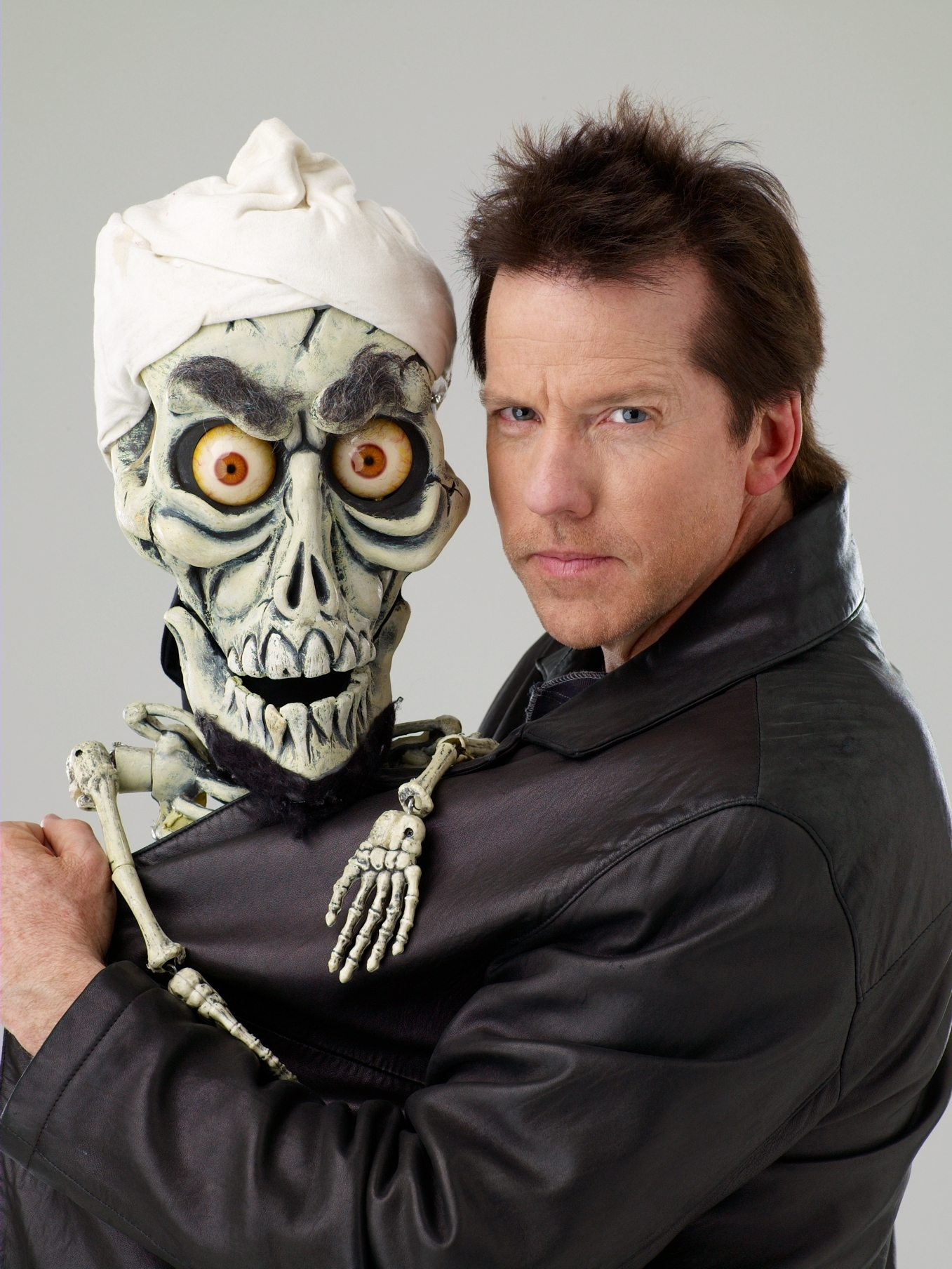
Jeff Dunham

- April 2 – Clark Gregg, American actor, director and screenwriter
- April 3 – Jaya Prada, Indian actress and politician
- April 5 – Sara Danius, Swedish writer and academic (d. 2019)
- April 8 – Izzy Stradlin, American guitarist
- April 9 – Imran Sherwani, British field hockey player (d. 2025)
- April 12
  - Carlos Sainz, Spanish rally driver
  - Sheila Kennedy, American model, actress and contestant on Big Brother 9
- April 13
  - Edivaldo Martins Fonseca, Brazilian footballer (d. 1993)
  - Hillel Slovak, Israeli-American guitarist (Red Hot Chili Peppers) (d. 1988)
- April 15
  - Nawal El Moutawakel, Moroccan hurdler
  - Jhon Jairo Velásquez, Colombian hitman and drug dealer (d. 2020)
- April 16 – Antony Blinken, American diplomat, 71st United States Secretary of State
- April 18 – Jeff Dunham, American ventriloquist
- April 19 – Al Unser Jr., American race car driver
- April 20
  - Scott McGehee, American film director and screenwriter
- April 21 – Craig Robinson, American college basketball coach
- April 22
  - Han Aiping, Chinese badminton player (d. 2019)
  - Jeff Minter, British video game designer and programmer
- April 23
  - Bram Bart, Dutch voice actor (d. 2012)
  - John Hannah, Scottish film and television actor
- April 24 – Rick Beato, American musician and music producer
- April 25 – Flex-Deon Blake, African-American gay pornographic actor (d. 2021)
- April 26
  - Debra Wilson, American actress and comedian
  - Michael Damian, American actor and singer
- April 29 – Stephan Burger, German Roman Catholic archbishop

=== May ===
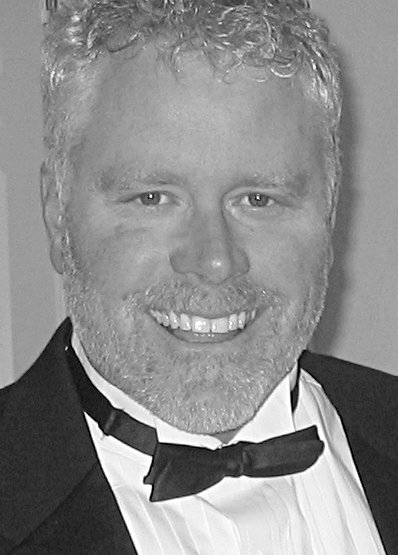
Sean McNamara

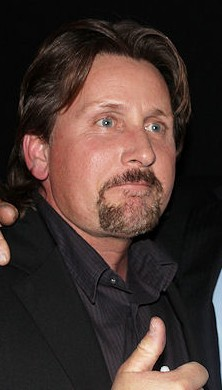
Emilio Estevez

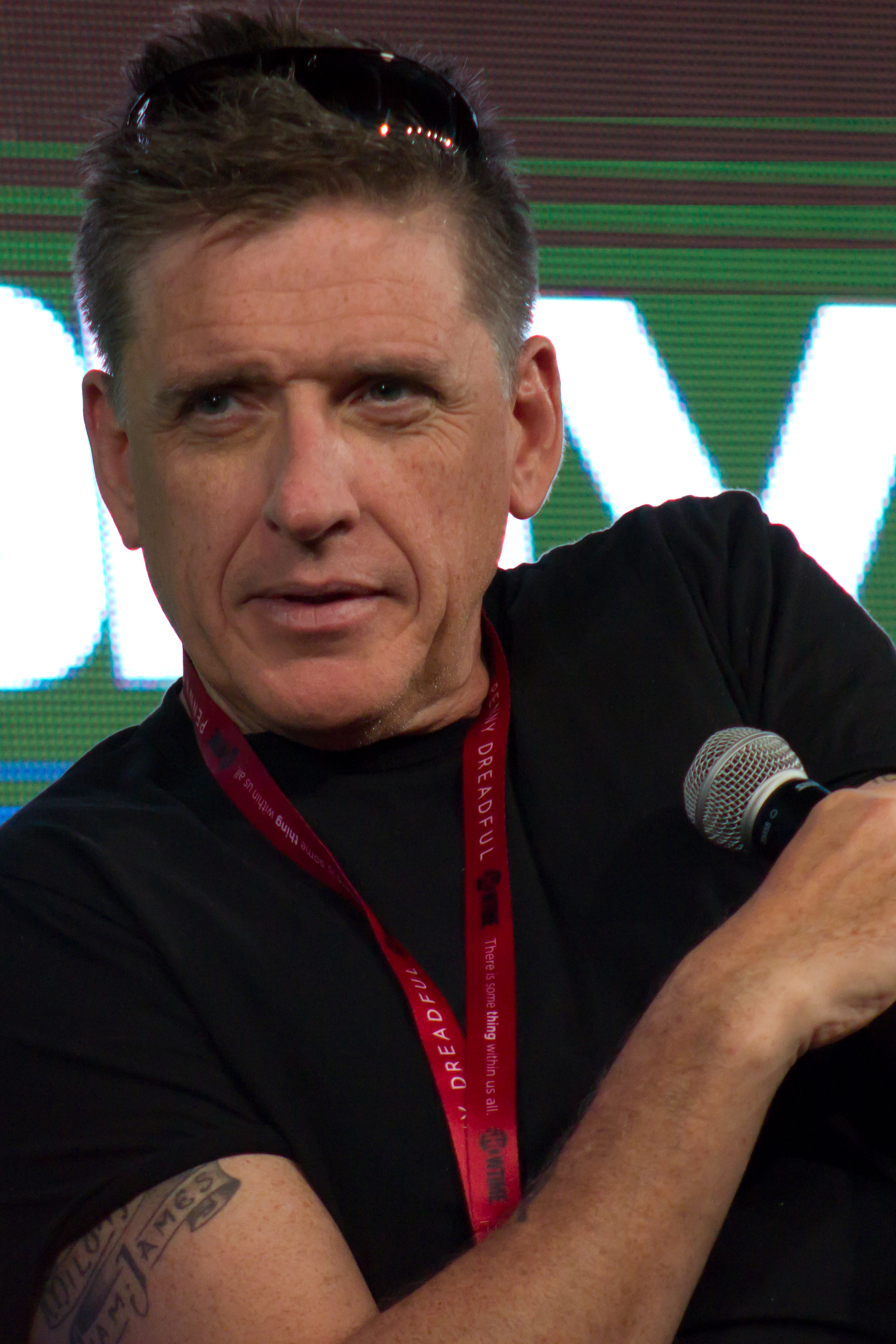
Craig Ferguson

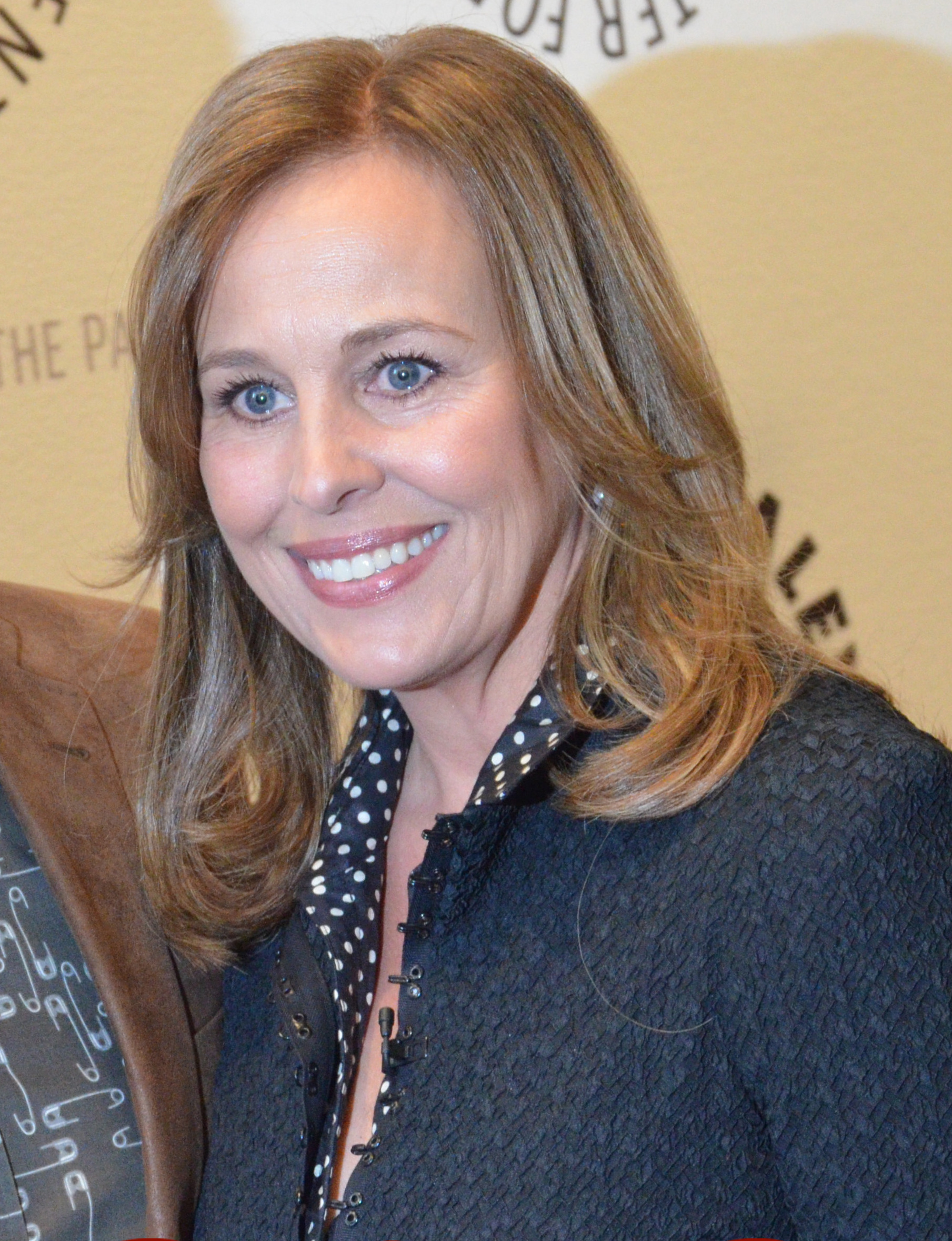
Genie Francis

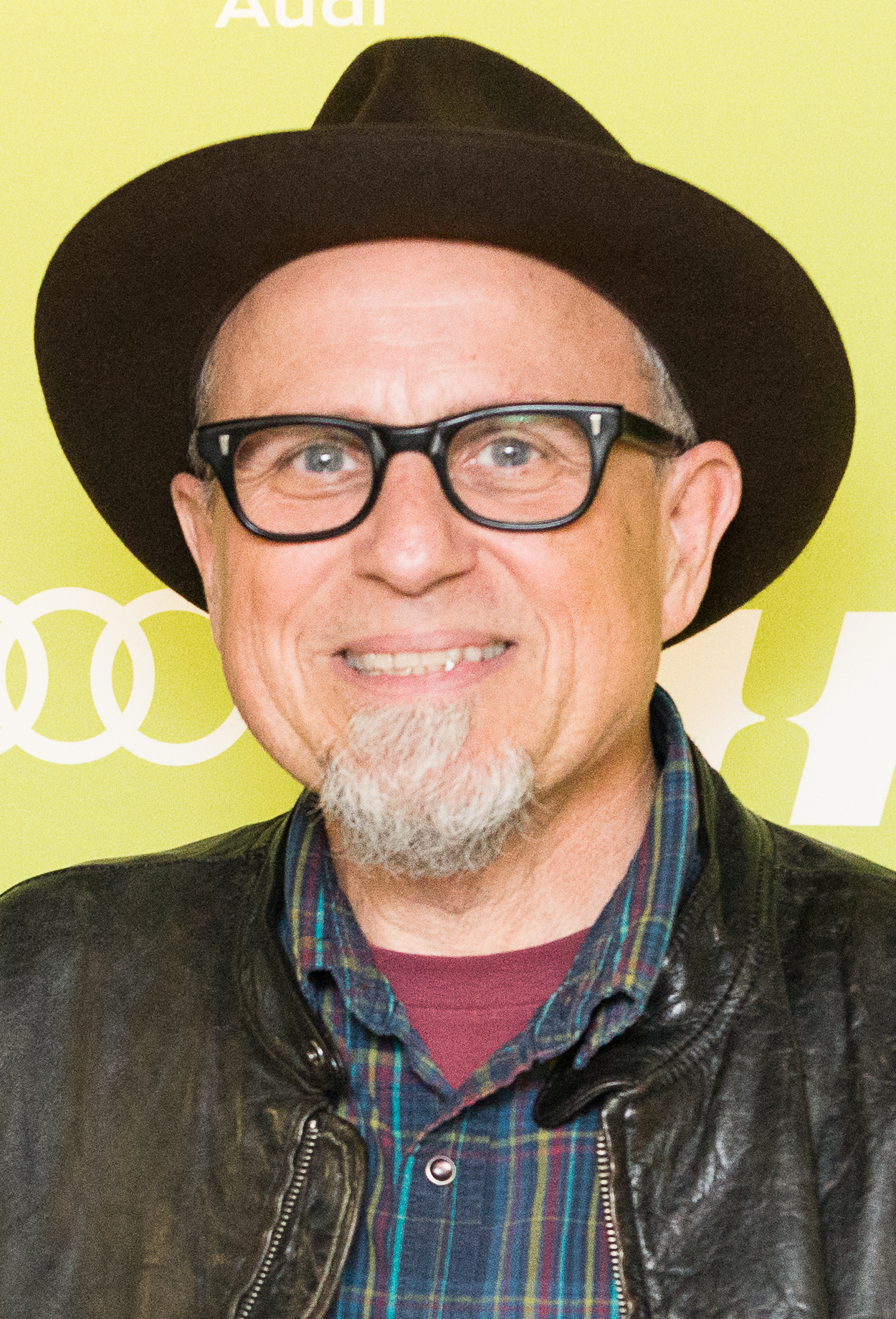
Bobcat Goldthwait

- May 1 – Maia Morgenstern, Romanian actress
- May 2
  - Elizabeth Berridge, American actress
  - Ryan Brown, American comic book writer, artist and toy designer
  - Jimmy White, British snooker player
- May 3 – Anders Graneheim, Swedish bodybuilder
- May 5
  - Robby Robbins, American politician
  - Kaoru Wada, Japanese composer
- May 7 – Ari Telch, Mexican actor
- May 8 – Natalia Molchanova, Russian free-diver
- May 9
  - Dave Gahan, English singer-songwriter
  - Paul Heaton, English singer-songwriter
  - Sean McNamara, American film director, film producer, actor and screenwriter
- May 12 – Emilio Estevez, American actor
- May 13 – Eduardo Palomo, Mexican actor (d. 2003)
- May 14
  - Ferran Adrià, Spanish chef and restaurateur
  - Danny Huston, American actor and film director
- May 15 – Rod Lurie, American-Israeli director
- May 16 – Michele Marziani, Italian novelist and journalist
- May 17
  - Lise Lyng Falkenberg, Danish writer
  - Craig Ferguson, Scottish-American actor, comedian and television host
  - Ferenc Krausz, Hungarian-born attosecond physicist, Nobel Prize laureate
  - Kim Mulkey, American basketball player/coach
  - Arturo Peniche, Mexican actor
- May 18
  - Karel Roden, Czech actor
  - Sandra, German pop singer
- May 19 – Frances Ondiviela, Spanish/Mexican actress
- May 20
  - Aleksandr Dedyushko, Russian actor (d. 2007)
  - Mike Jeffries, American soccer coach
  - Ralph Peterson Jr., American jazz drummer and bandleader (d. 2021)
- May 21 – Cam Brainard, American voice actor and narrator
- May 22 – Brian Pillman, American professional wrestler (d. 1997)
- May 24 – Gene Anthony Ray, American actor (d. 2003)
- May 25 – Anders Johansson, Swedish drummer
- May 26
  - Genie Francis, American actress
  - Bobcat Goldthwait, American comedian
- May 27
  - Scott Perry, American politician
  - Ravi Shastri, Indian cricketer
- May 28
  - Brandon Cruz, American child actor and punk rocker
  - François-Henri Pinault, French businessman
- May 30 – Timo Soini, Finnish politician
- May 31
  - Dina Boluarte, Peruvian politician, 64th President of Peru
  - Corey Hart, Canadian singer
  - Noriko Hidaka, Japanese voice actress
  - Victoria Ruffo, Mexican actress

=== June ===
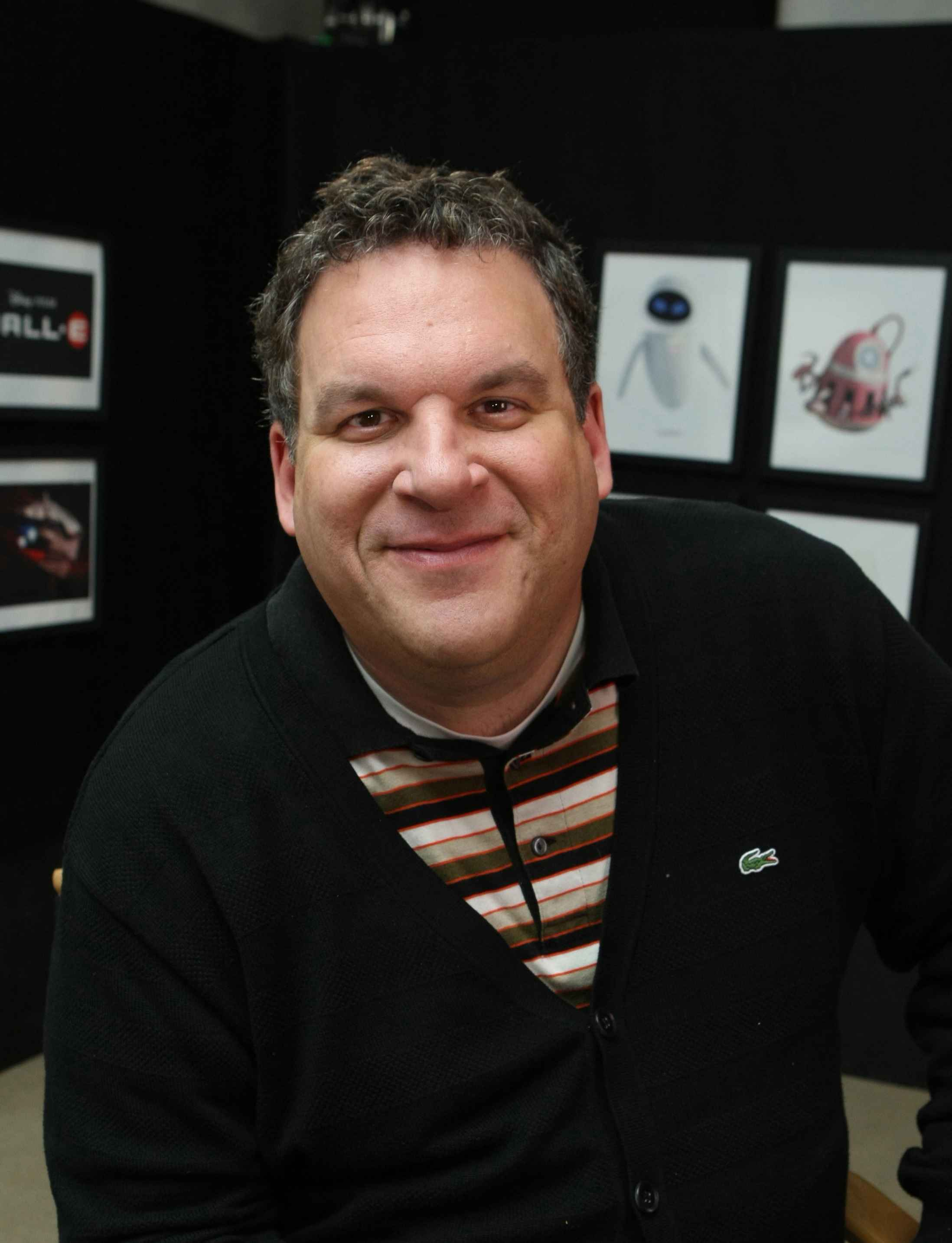
Jeff Garlin

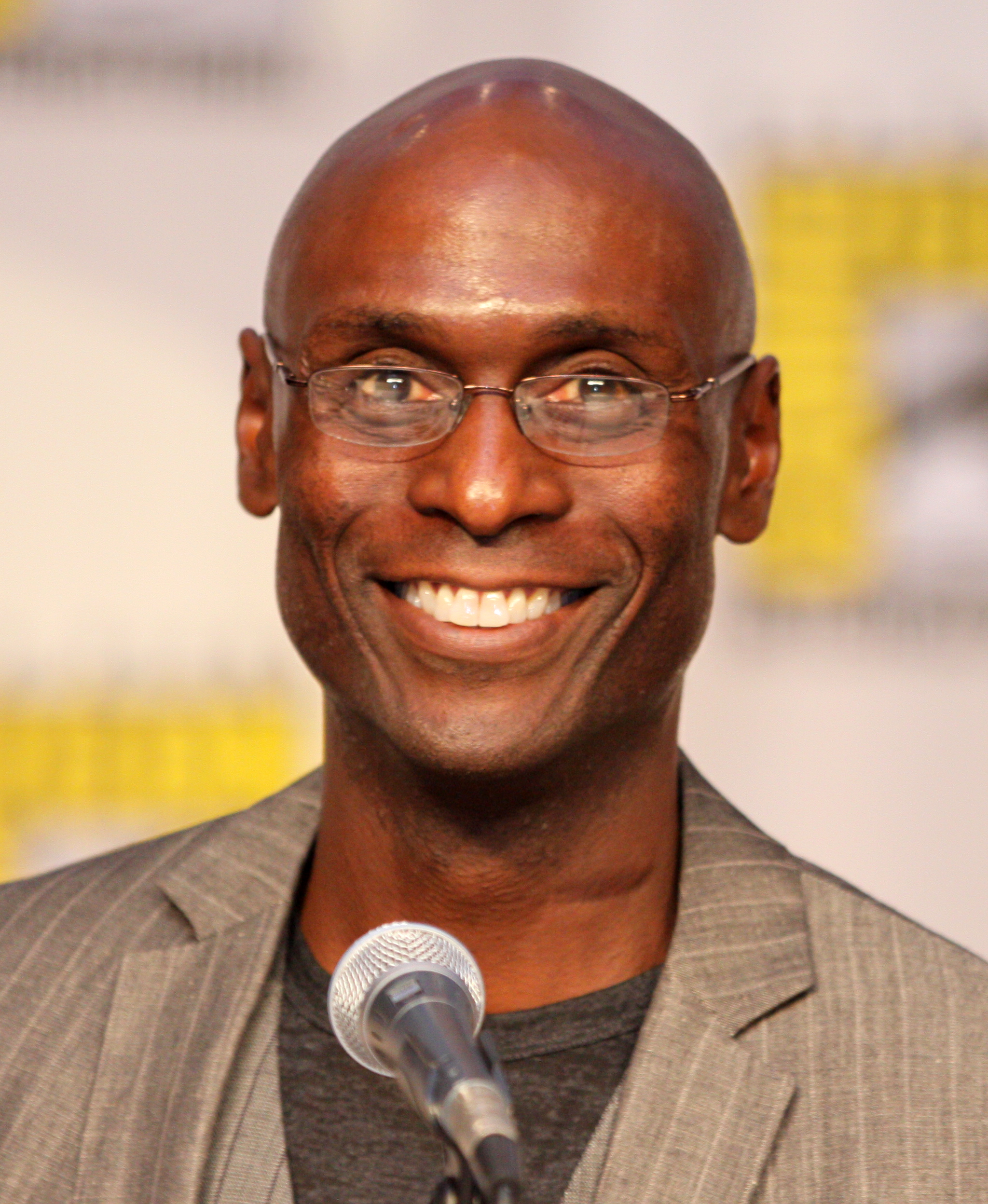
Lance Reddick

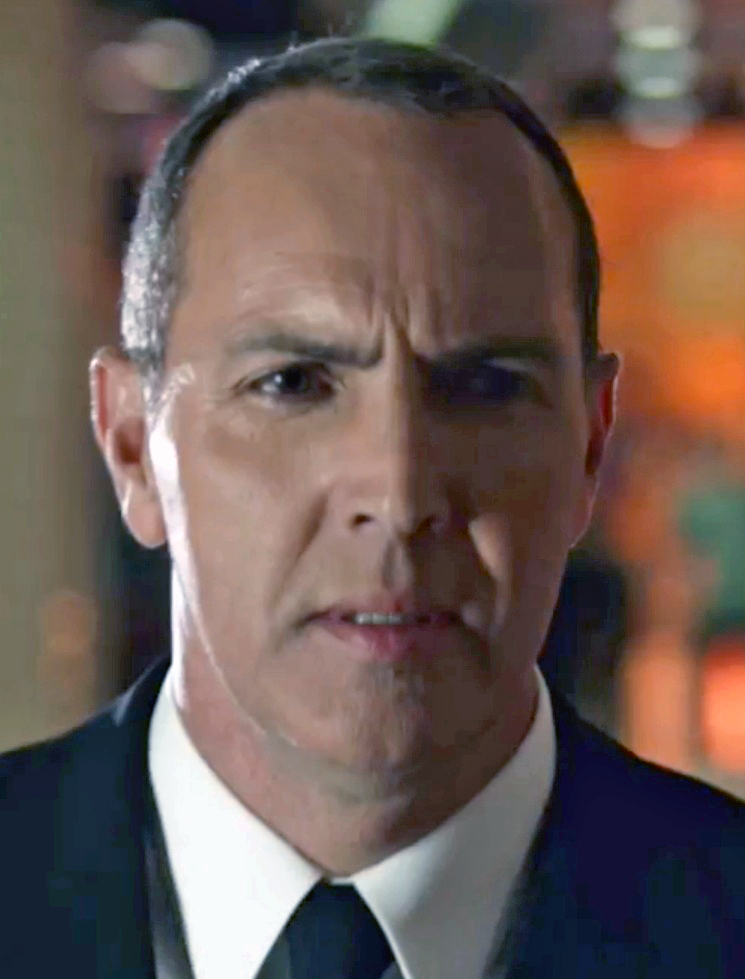
Arnold Vosloo

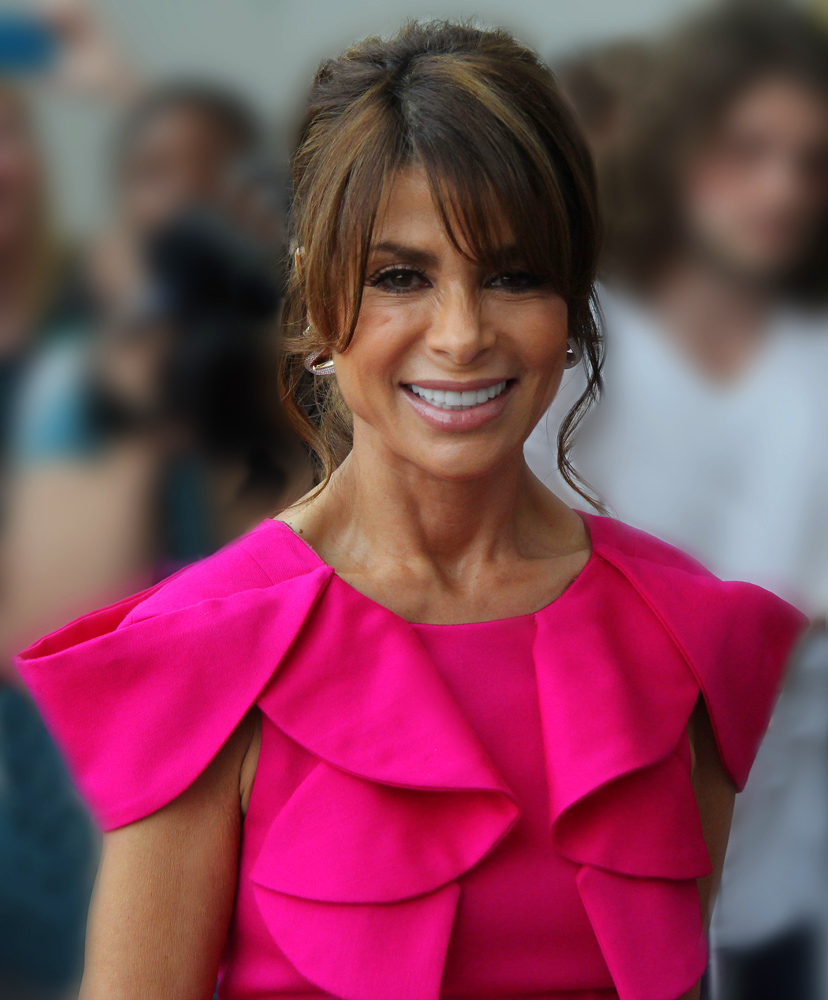
Paula Abdul

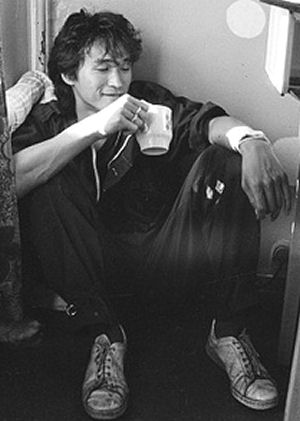
Viktor Tsoi

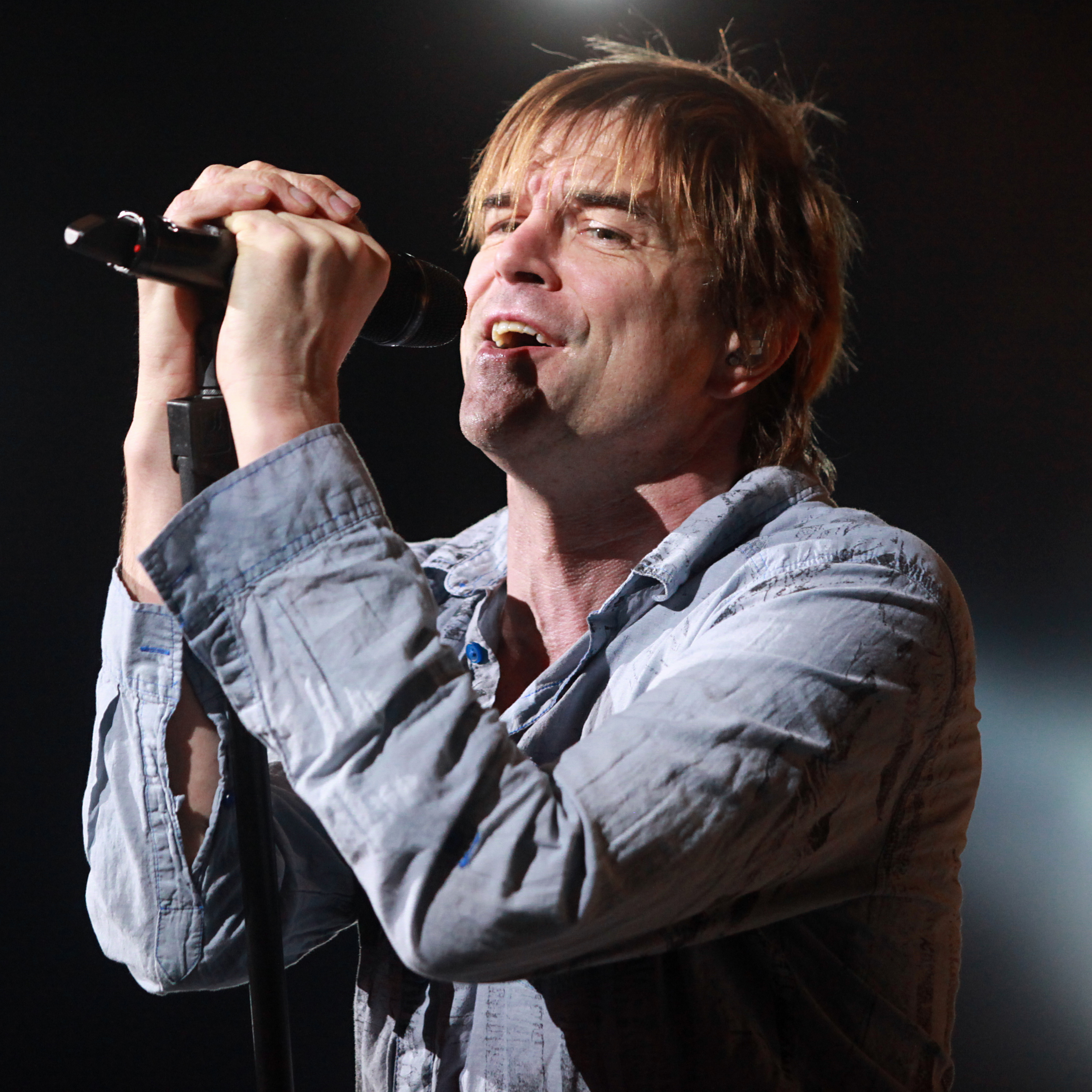
Campino

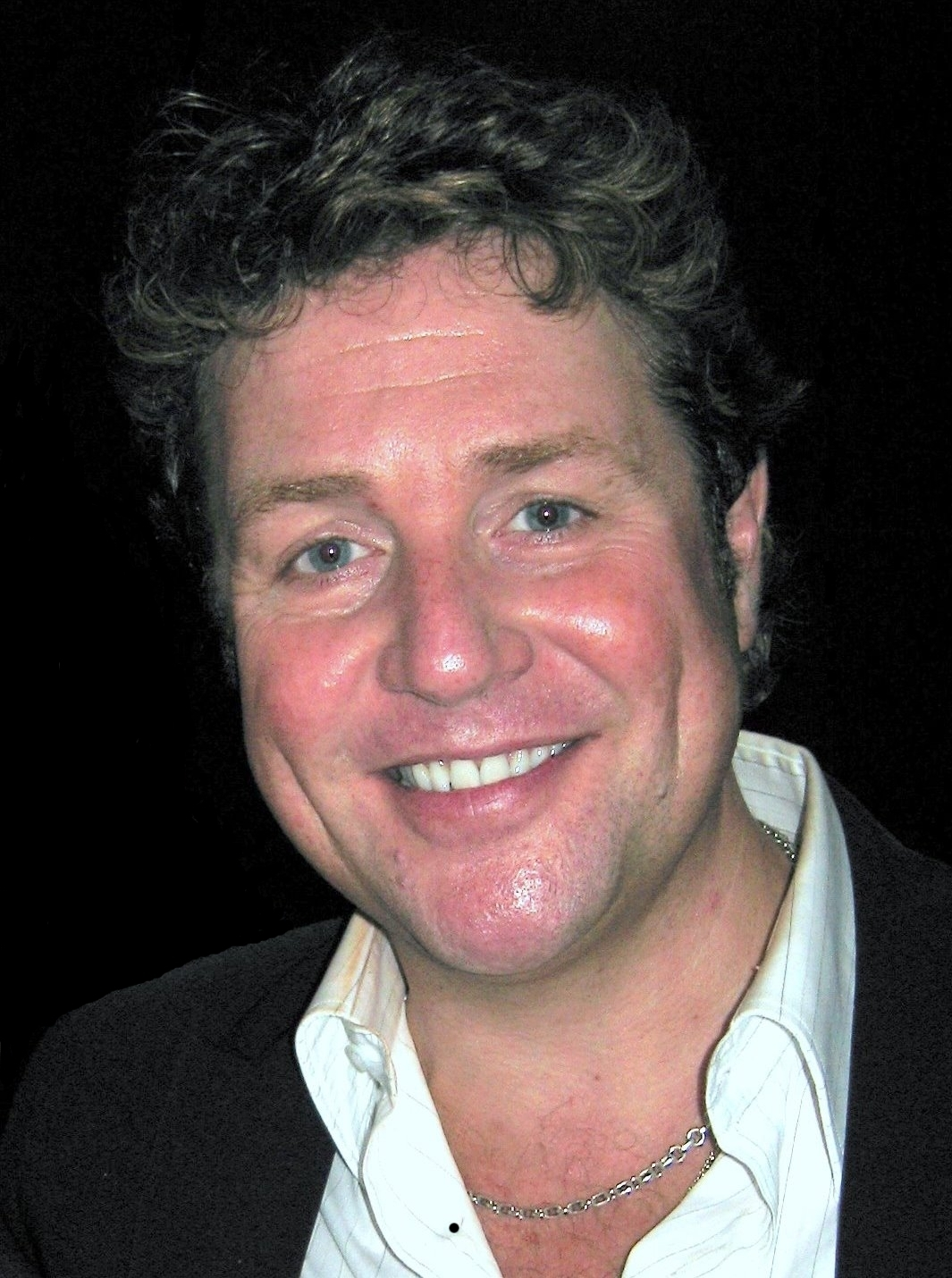
Michael Ball

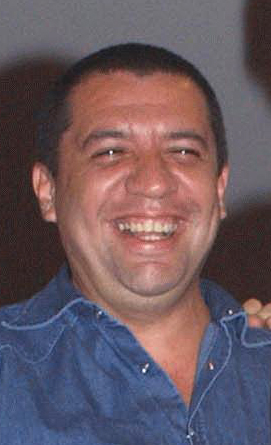
Bussunda

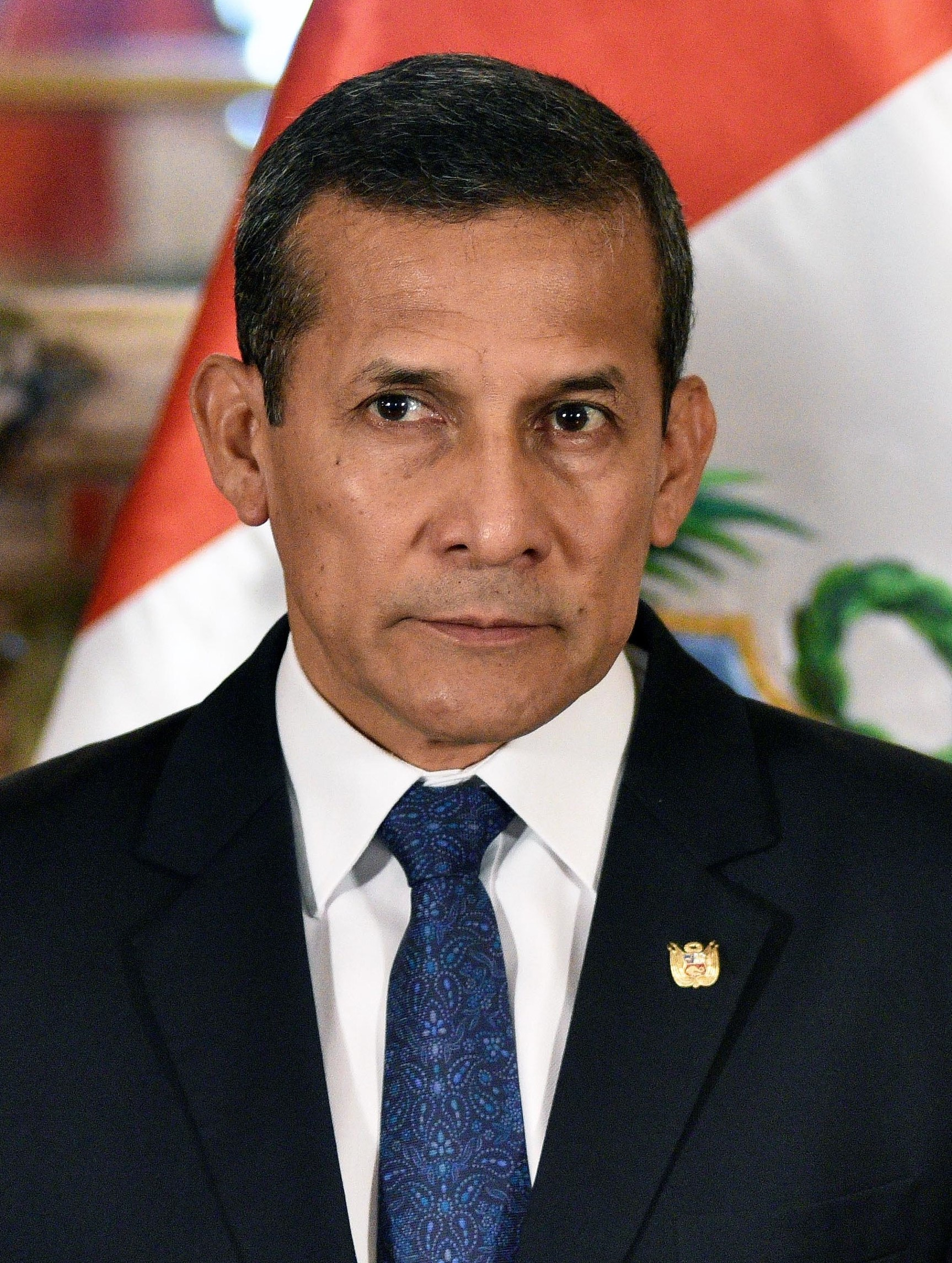
Ollanta Humala

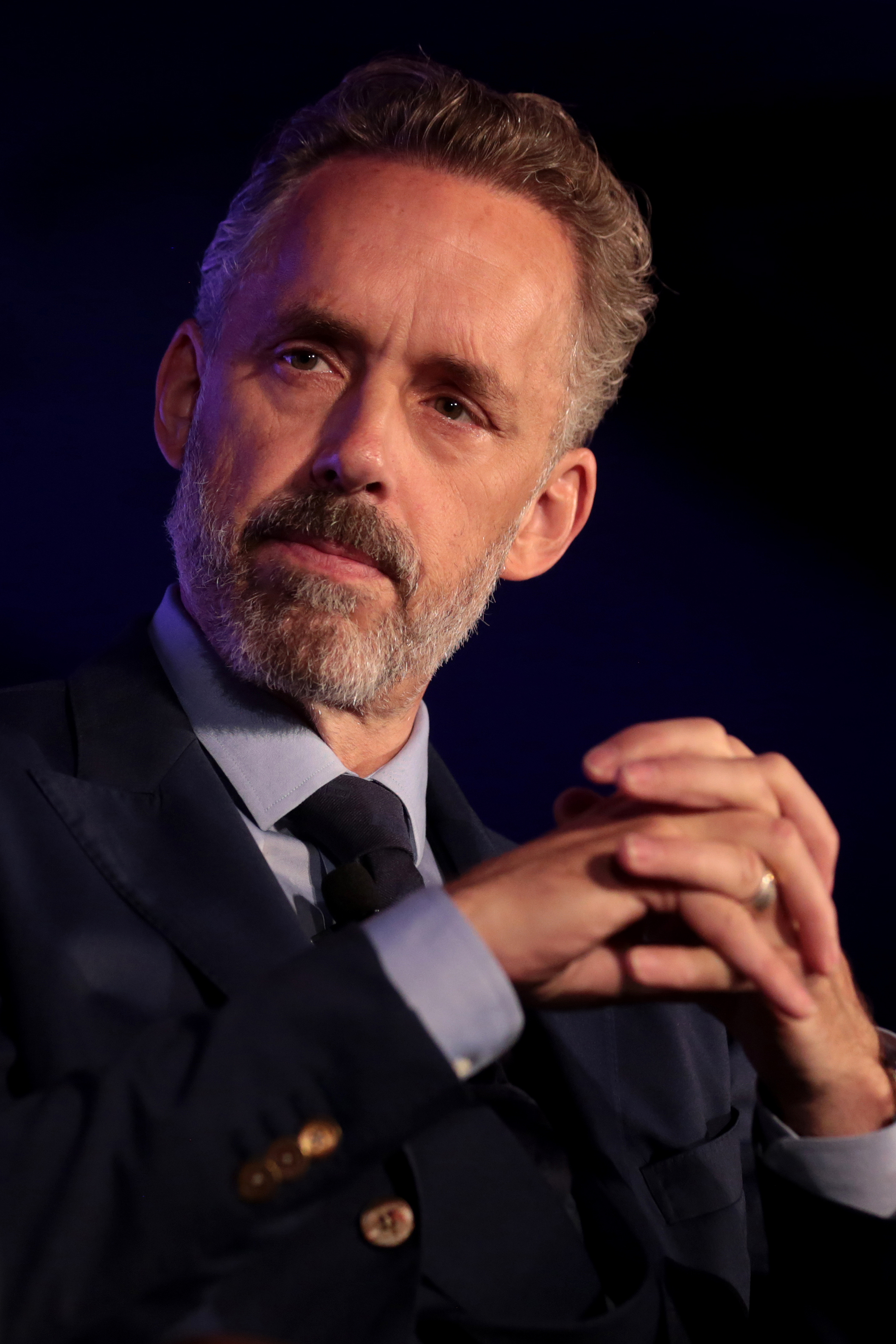
Jordan Peterson

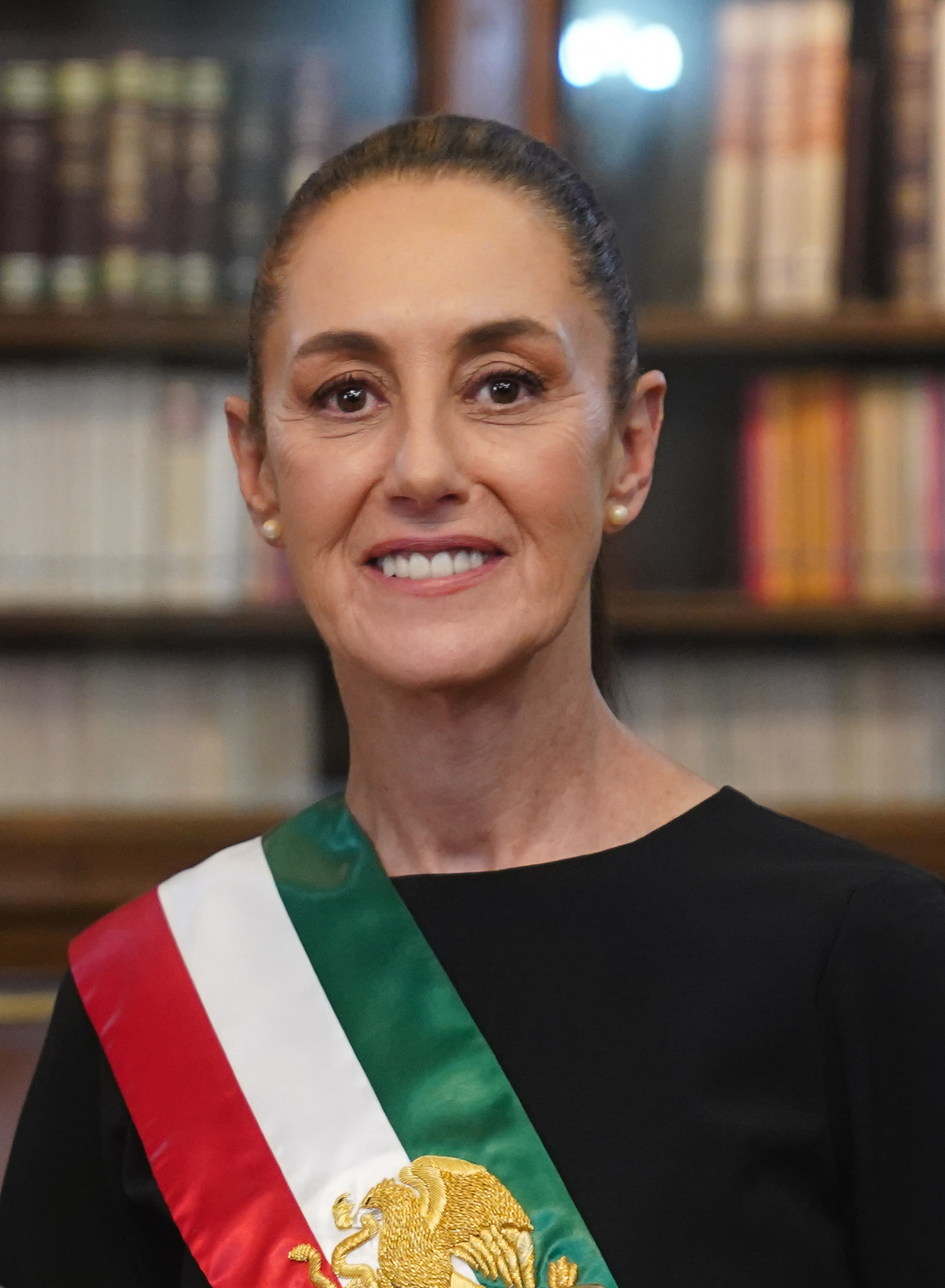
Claudia Sheinbaum

- June 1
  - Sherri Howard, American athlete
  - Sidney Jayarathna, Sri Lankan politician, MP (2001–2004, 2015–2020)
- June 3 – David Cole, American record producer and songwriter (d. 1995)
- June 4 – Trinidad Jiménez, Spanish politician and diplomat
- June 5 – Jeff Garlin, American actor
- June 6 – Alex Datcher, American actress
- June 7
  - Thierry Hazard, French singer-songwriter
  - Lance Reddick, American actor and musician (d. 2023)
- June 8 – Suzy Gorman, American photographer
- June 10
  - Gina Gershon, American actress
  - Ralf Schumann, German sport shooter
  - Ahmed Khaled Tawfik, Egyptian author and physician (d. 2018)
- June 11
  - Olga Charvátová, Czech alpine skier
  - Erika Salumäe, Estonian cyclist
  - Toshihiko Seki, Japanese voice actor
- June 12 – Jordan Peterson, Canadian clinical psychologist and professor of psychology
- June 13
  - Ally Sheedy, American actress
  - Vladimir Pravik, Soviet firefighter (d. 1986)
  - Bence Szabó, Hungarian fencer
- June 14 – Emilija Erčić, Yugoslav (Serbian) handball player
- June 15 – Andrea Rost, Hungarian lyric soprano
- June 16 – Arnold Vosloo, South African actor
- June 18
  - Mitsuharu Misawa, Japanese professional wrestler (d. 2009)
  - Lisa Randall, American theoretical physicist
- June 19 – Paula Abdul, American dancer, choreographer and singer
- June 21
  - Pipilotti Rist, Swiss video artist
  - Viktor Tsoi, Soviet underground singer-songwriter (d. 1990)
- June 22
  - Campino, German singer
  - Stephen Chow, Hong Kong actor and director
  - Clyde Drexler, American basketball player
- June 23
  - Kari Takko, Finnish ice hockey player
  - Shriti Vadera, Baroness Vadera, Ugandan-born British banker
- June 24
  - Juan Fernando Brügge, Argentine politician
  - Claudia Sheinbaum, president of Mexico
- June 25
  - Pavla Tomicová, Czech actress
  - Ricardo Iorio, Argentine heavy metal musician
  - Bussunda, Brazilian comedian (d. 2006)
- June 26
  - Morten Skogstad, Norwegian drummer
  - Hubert Strolz, Austrian alpine skier
- June 27
  - Michael Ball, British actor and singer
  - Ollanta Humala, Peruvian politician, 65th President of Peru
  - Tony Leung Chiu-wai, Hong Kong actor
  - Mambury Njie, Gambian politician
- June 29
  - Mario Castañeda, Mexican voice actor and dubbing director
  - Amanda Donohoe, English actress
  - George D. Zamka, American astronaut
  - Guy Lecluyse, French comedian and actor
- June 30
  - Florence Pernel, French actress
  - Predrag Bjelac, Serbian actress

=== July ===
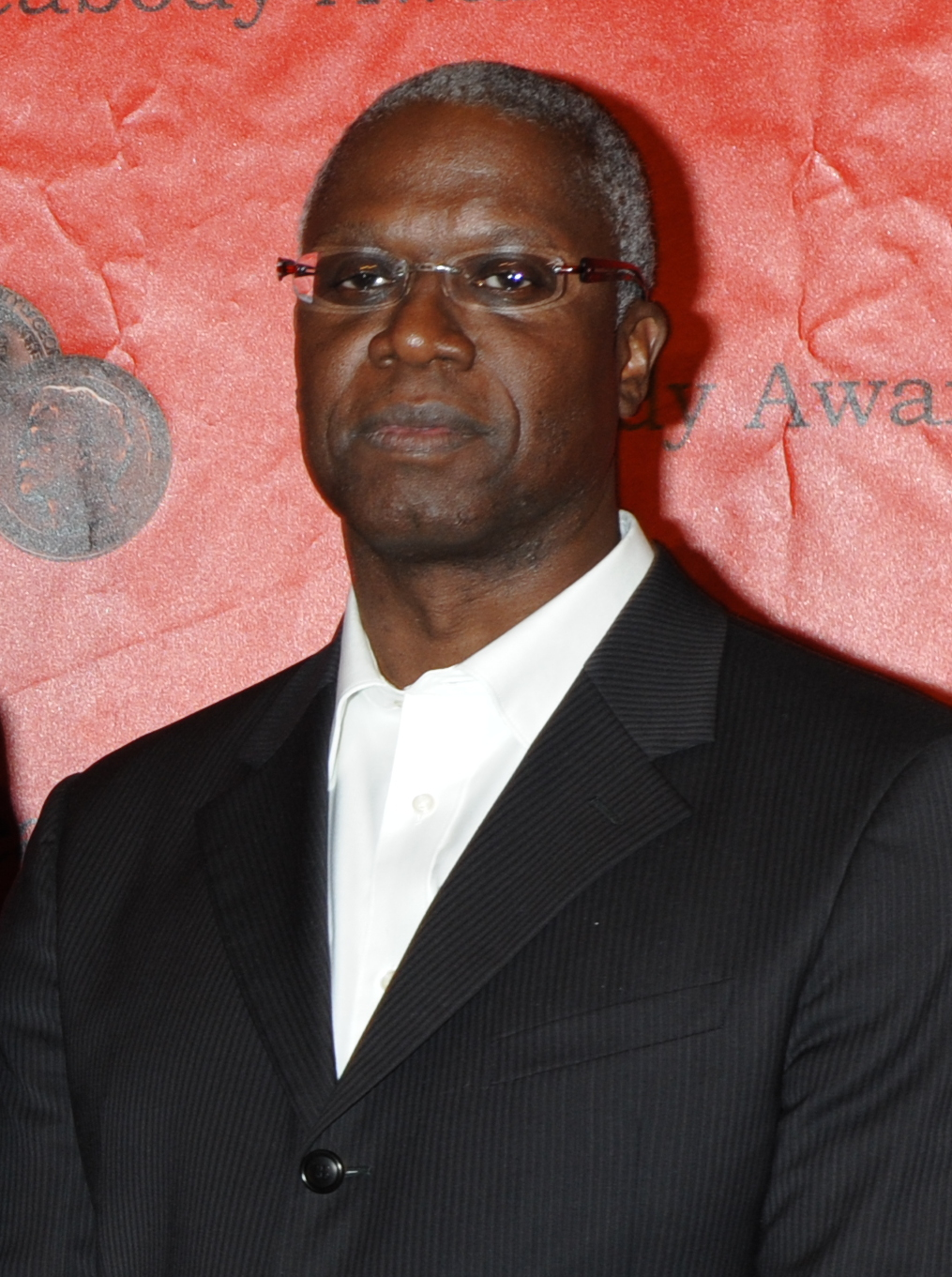
Andre Braugher

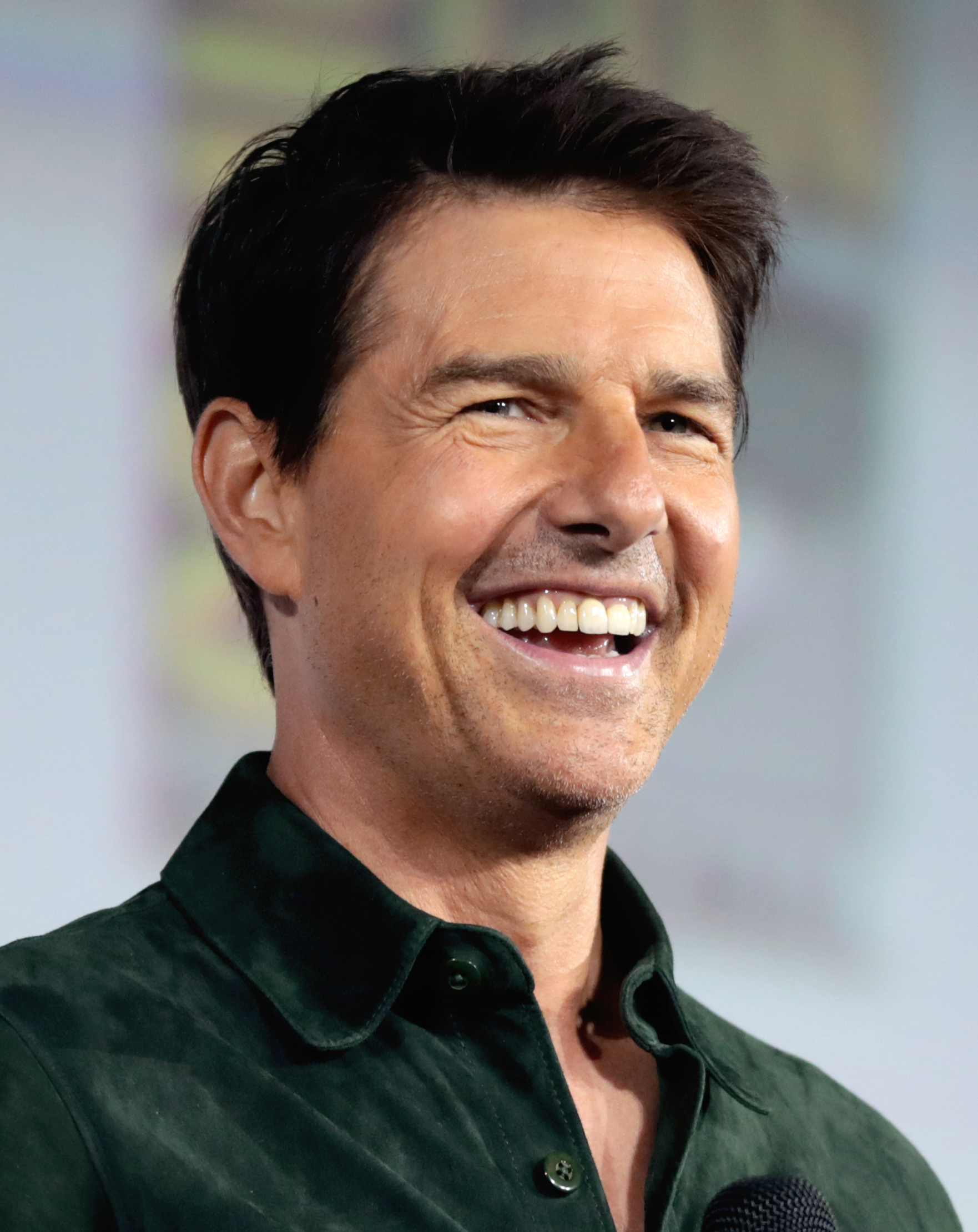
Tom Cruise

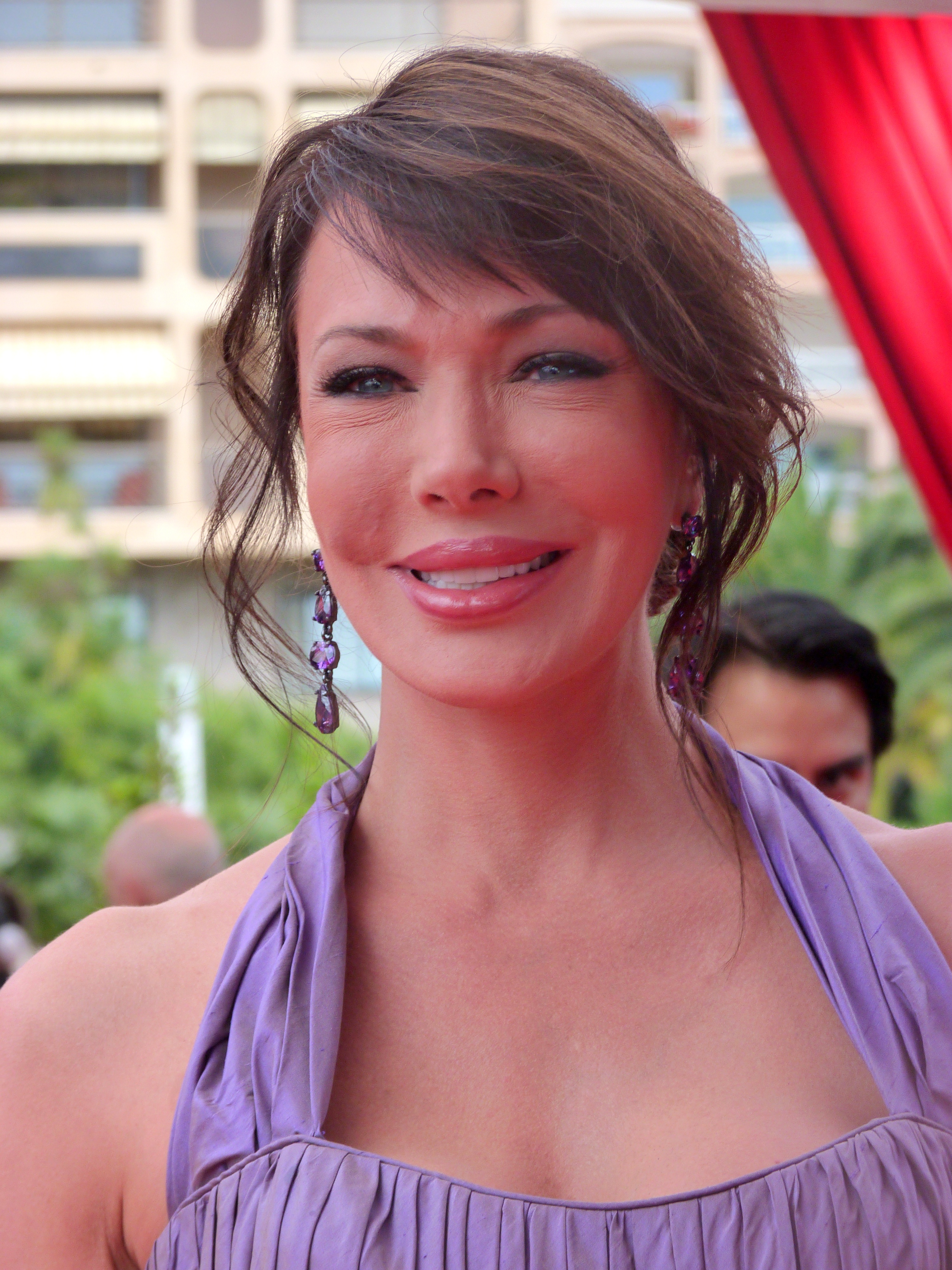
Hunter Tylo

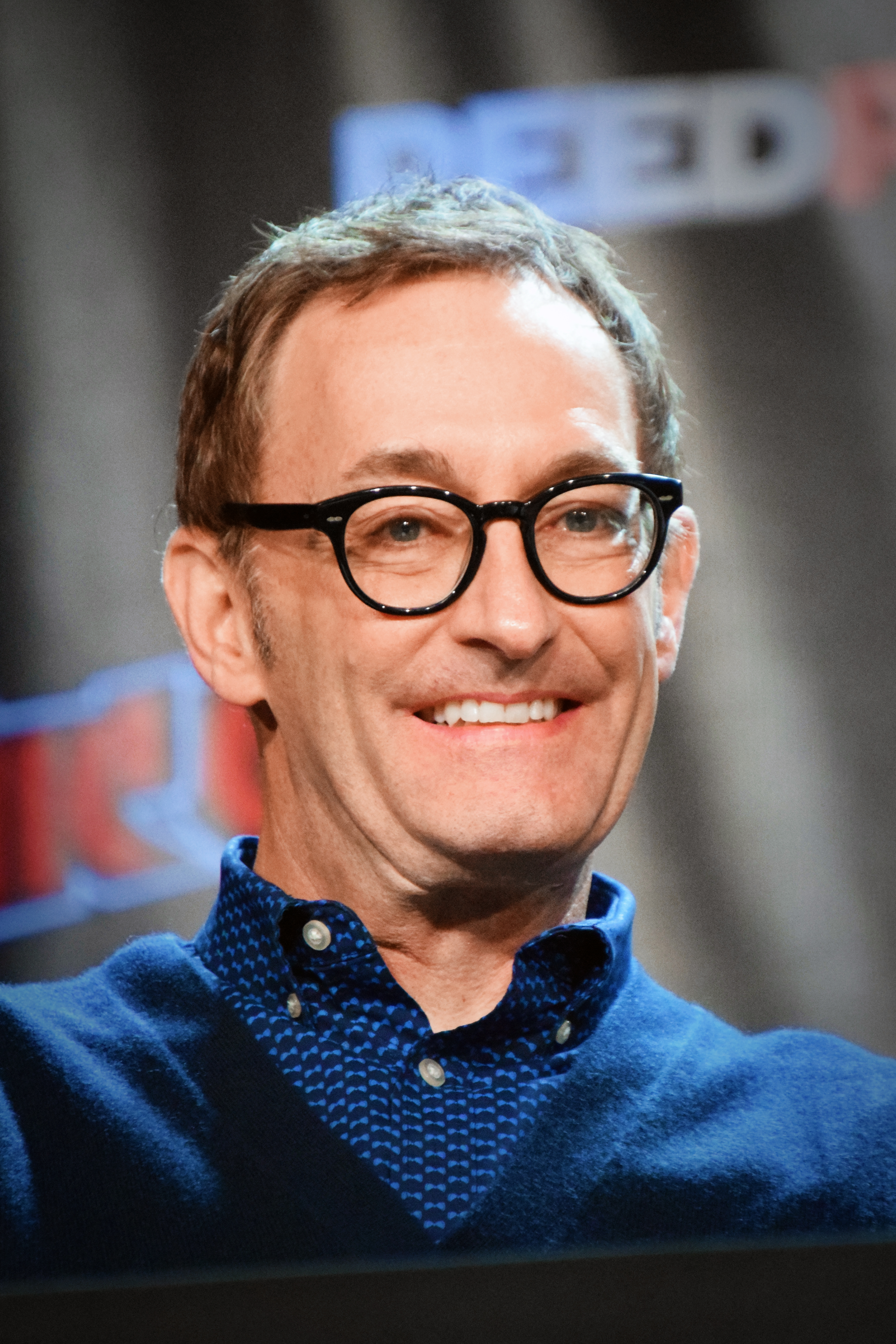
Tom Kenny

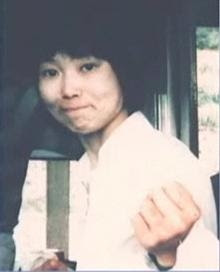
Aya Kitō

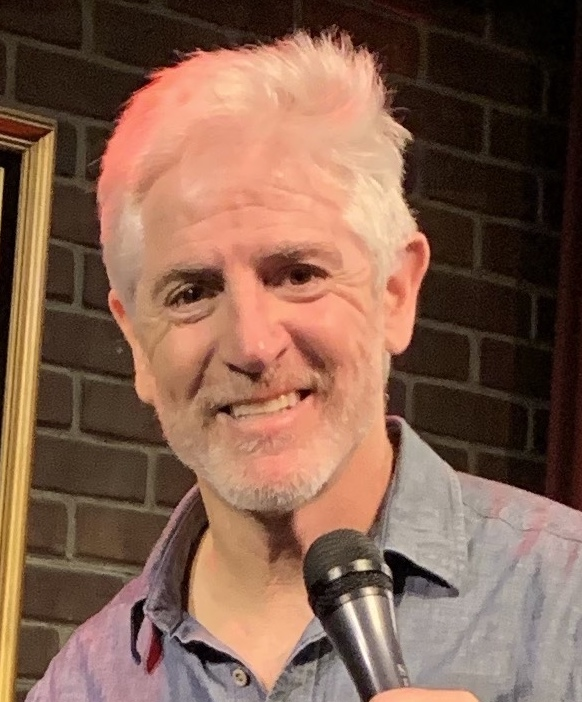
Carlos Alazraqui

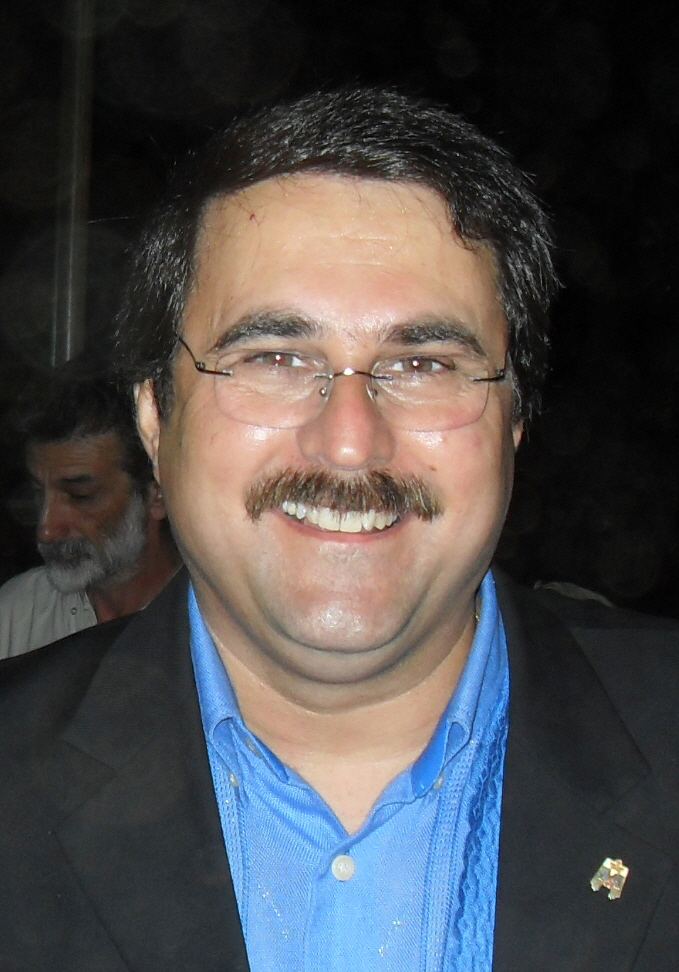
Federico Franco

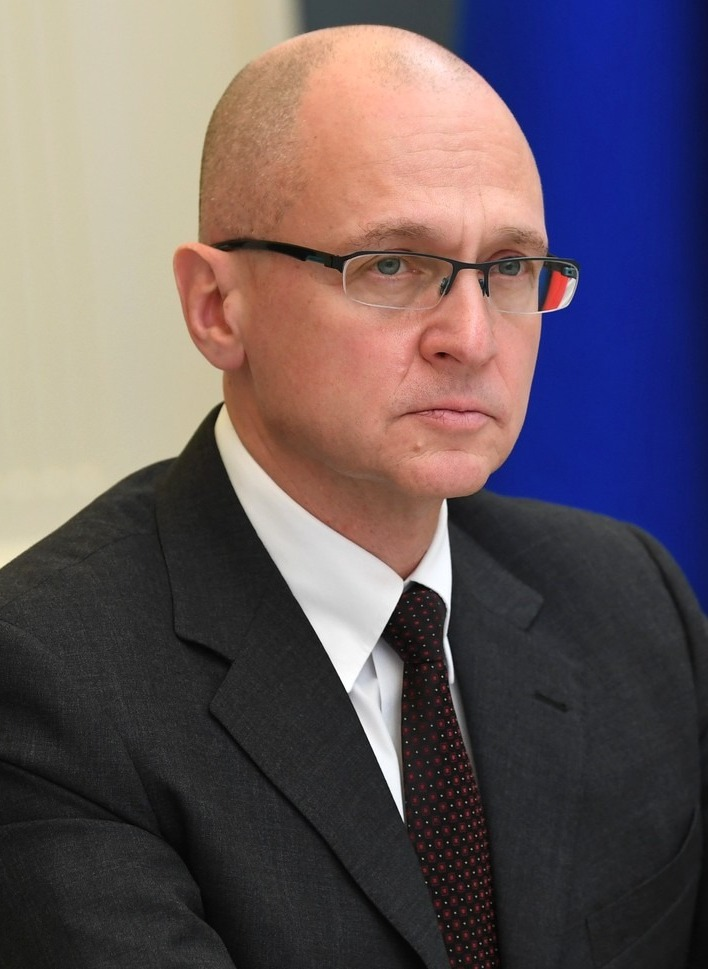
Sergey Kiriyenko

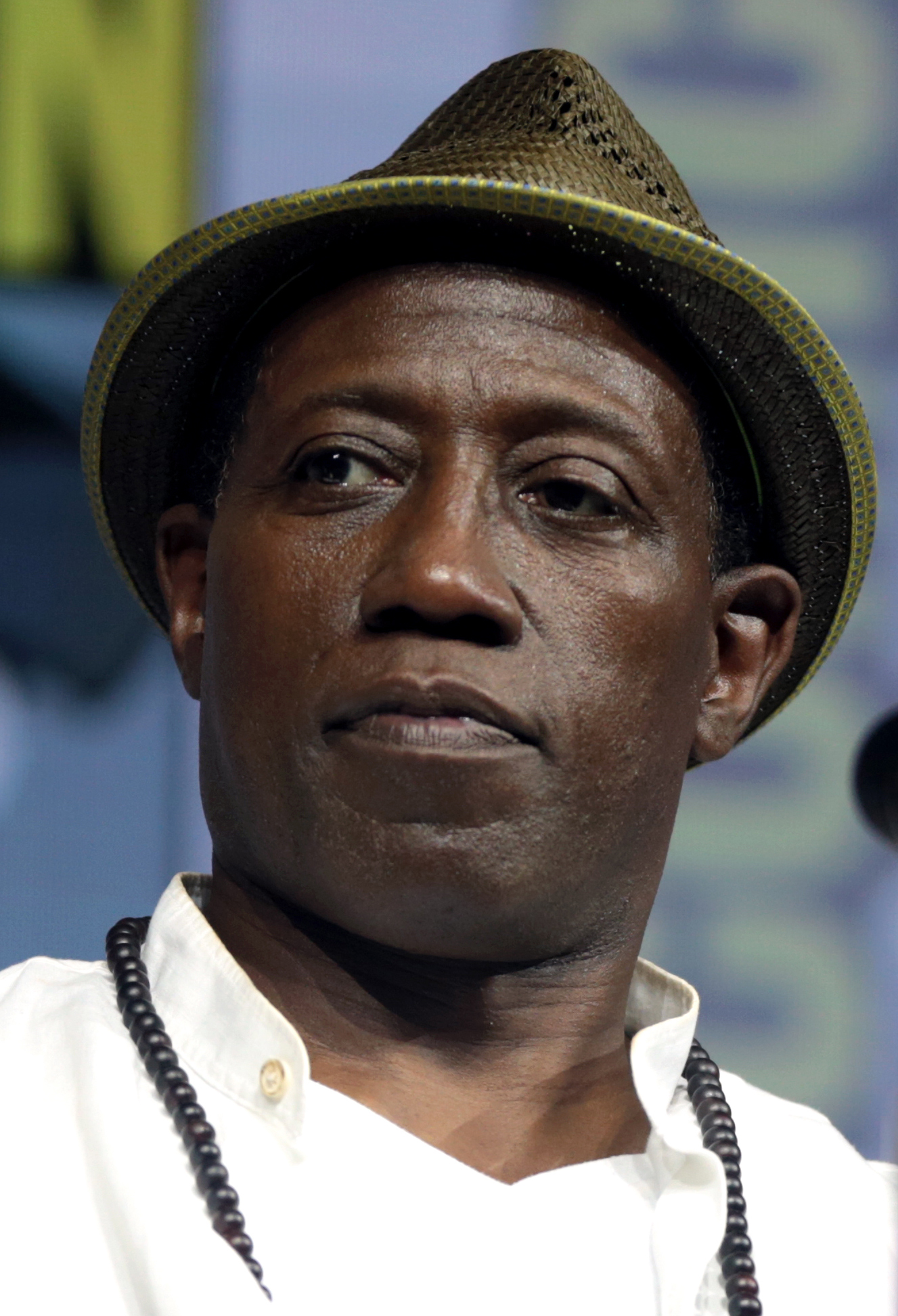
Wesley Snipes

- July 1
  - Andre Braugher, American actor (d. 2023)
  - Rafał Bruski, Polish politician
  - Ahmad Bin Byat, Emirati businessman
- July 2
  - Roberto Blades, Panamanian Salsa singer
  - Mahasweta Ray, Indian actress
- July 3
  - Tom Cruise, American actor and film producer
  - Thomas Gibson, American actor and director
- July 4 – Pam Shriver, American tennis player
- July 5 – Amrozi, Indonesian terrorist (d. 2008)
- July 6
  - Christopher Chaplin, Swiss-English composer and actor
  - Natalia Dicenta, Spanish actress
- July 7
  - Klaus Tange, Danish actor
  - Vadivukkarasi, Indian actress
- July 8
  - Oreste Baldini, Italian actor and voice actor
  - Joan Osborne, American singer-songwriter
- July 9
  - Roni Ben-Hur, Israeli jazz guitarist
  - Sukhbir Singh Badal, Indian politician
  - Nikola Čuturilo, Serbian rock musician
  - Jan Degenhardt, German lawyer and folk-singer
- July 10
  - Trond Helleland, Norwegian politician
  - Grant Kirkhope, Scottish video game composer
- July 11
  - Fumiya Fujii, Japanese singer
  - Pauline McLynn, Irish actress
- July 13
  - Tom Kenny, American actor, voice actor and comedian
  - Zlata Petrović, Serbian pop singer
  - Erry Yulian Triblas Adesta, Indonesian academic
- July 14
  - Michelle Ford, Australian swimmer
  - Patricio Toledo, Chilean footballer
- July 15
  - Martin Roach, Canadian actor
- July 16
  - Mathias Herrmann, German actor
  - Uwe Hohn, German athlete
  - Grigory Leps, Russian singer
- July 17 – Rita Rätsepp, Estonian actress and psychologist
- July 18 – Shaun Micallef, Australian actor, comedian and writer
- July 19
  - Anthony Edwards, American actor and director
  - Cynthia Farrelly Gesner, American actress
  - Aya Kitō, Japanese diarist (d. 1988)
- July 20
  - Carlos Alazraqui, American stand-up comedian, actor, voice actor, singer, impressionist, producer and screenwriter
  - Primož Ulaga, Yugoslavian/Slovenian ski jumper
  - Emmanuel Niyonkuru, Burundian politician (d. 2017)
  - Chee Soon Juan, Singaporean politician
- July 21
  - Gabi Bauer, German journalist and television presenter
  - Ike Eisenmann, American actor and voice artist
- July 22
  - Steve Albini, American musician, record producer and music journalist (d. 2024)
  - Roman Madyanov, Russian actor (d. 2024)
- July 23
  - Eriq La Salle, American actor
  - Bruce Marshall, American ice hockey coach (d. 2016)
- July 24 – Federico Franco, Paraguayan politician, 49th President of Paraguay
- July 26
  - Galina Chistyakova, Ukrainian athlete
  - Sergey Kiriyenko, Russian politician and statesman, 31st Prime Minister of Russia
- July 29
  - Isabel Cristina Mrad Campos, Brazilian victim of feminicide declared blessed by Roman Catholicism (d. 1982)
  - Scott Steiner, American professional wrestler
- July 30 – Kaveinga Faʻanunu, Tongan politician (d. 2011)
- July 31
  - John Laurinaitis, American professional wrestler
  - Wesley Snipes, African-American actor and martial artist

=== August ===
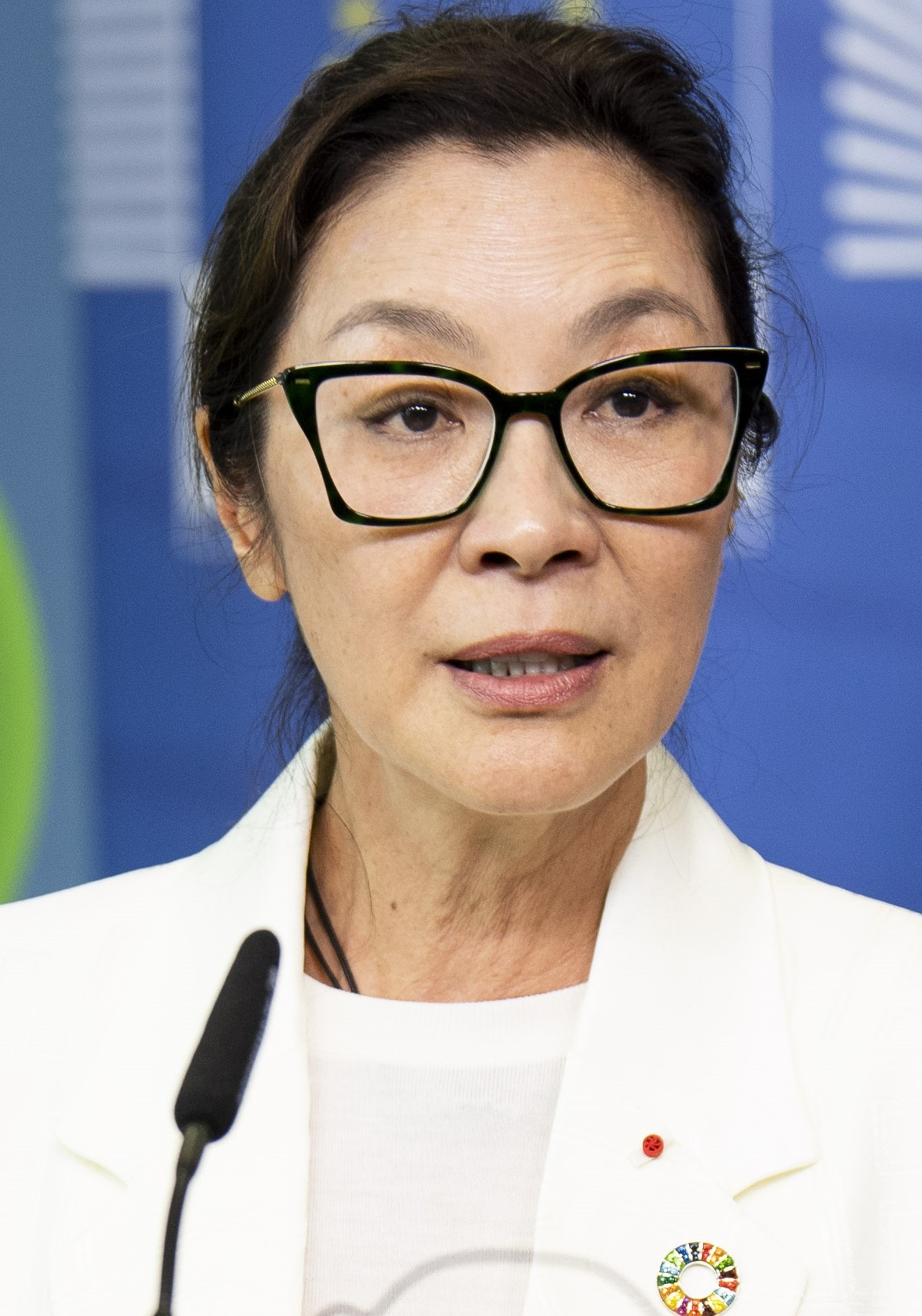
Michelle Yeoh

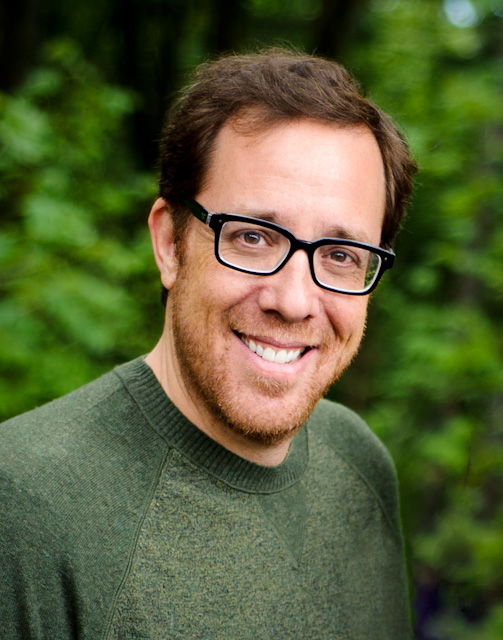
Rob Minkoff

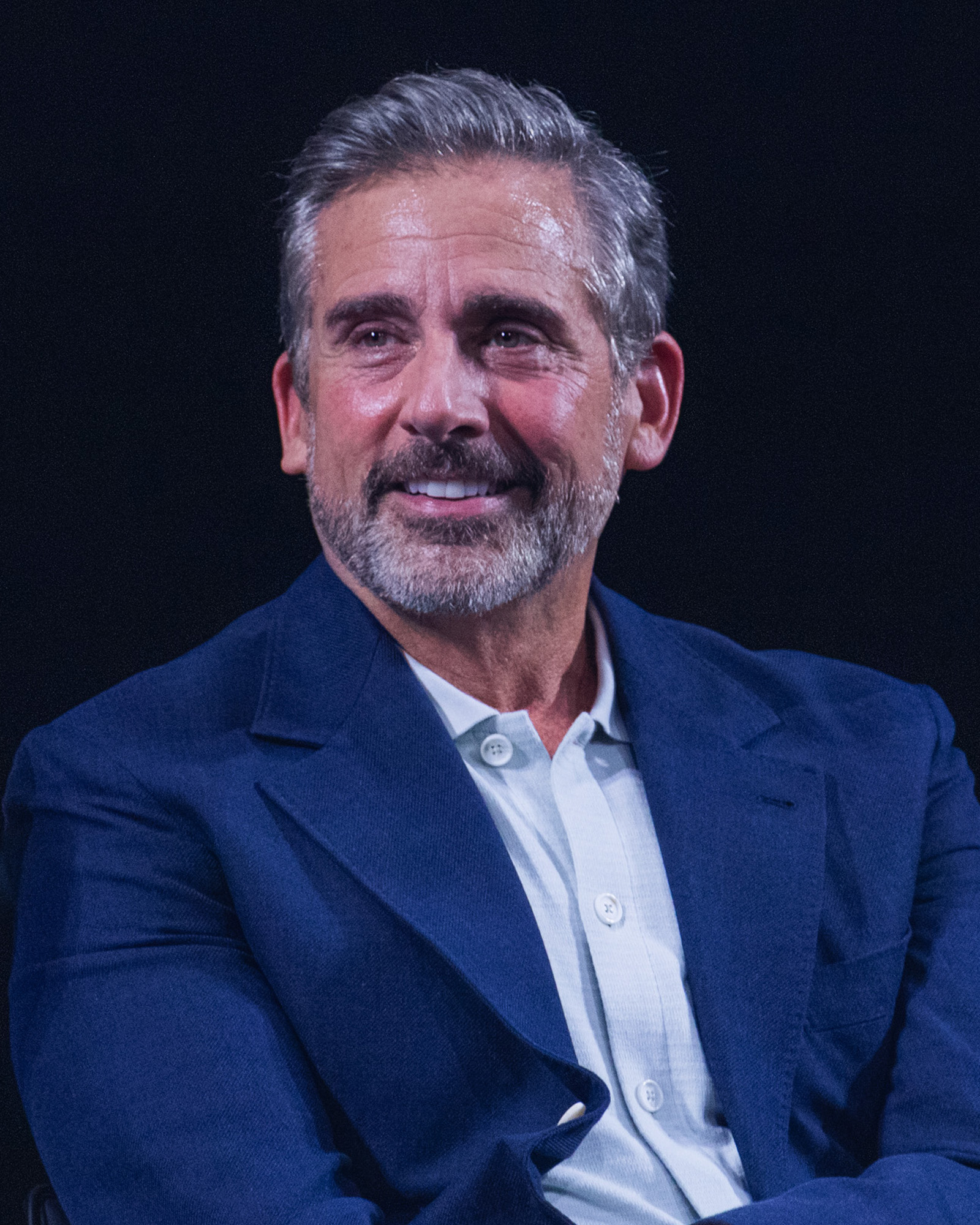
Steve Carell

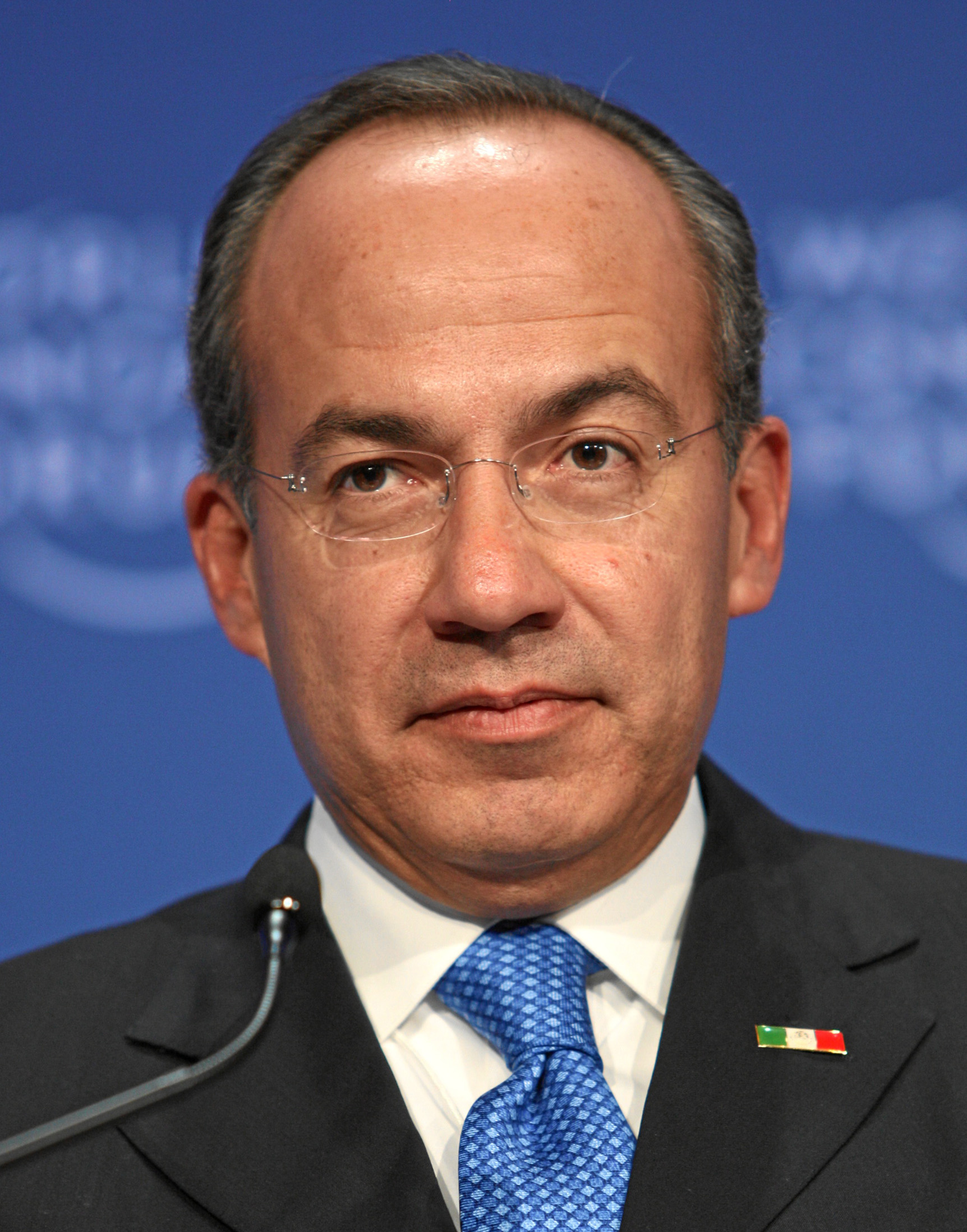
Felipe Calderón

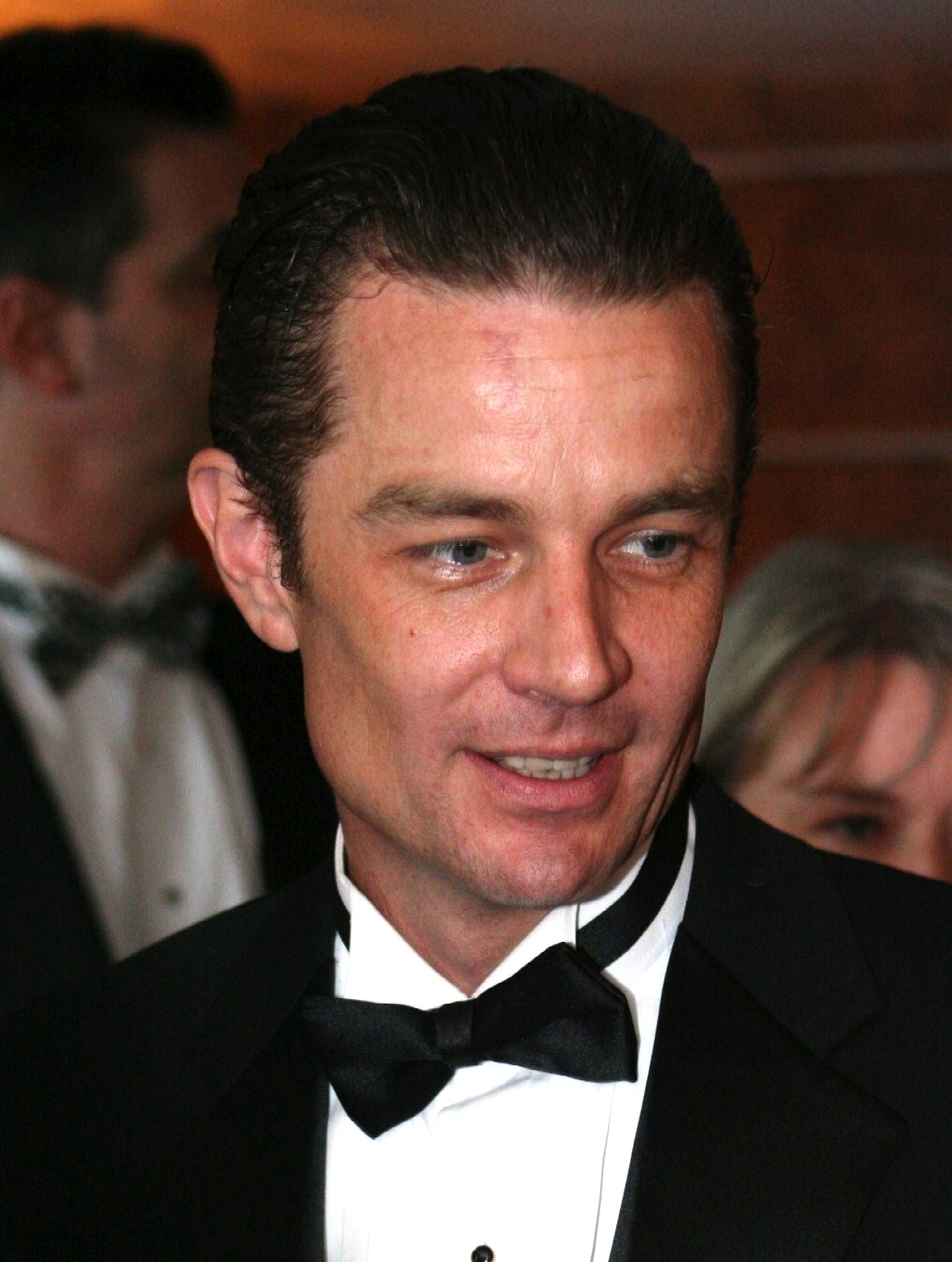
James Marsters

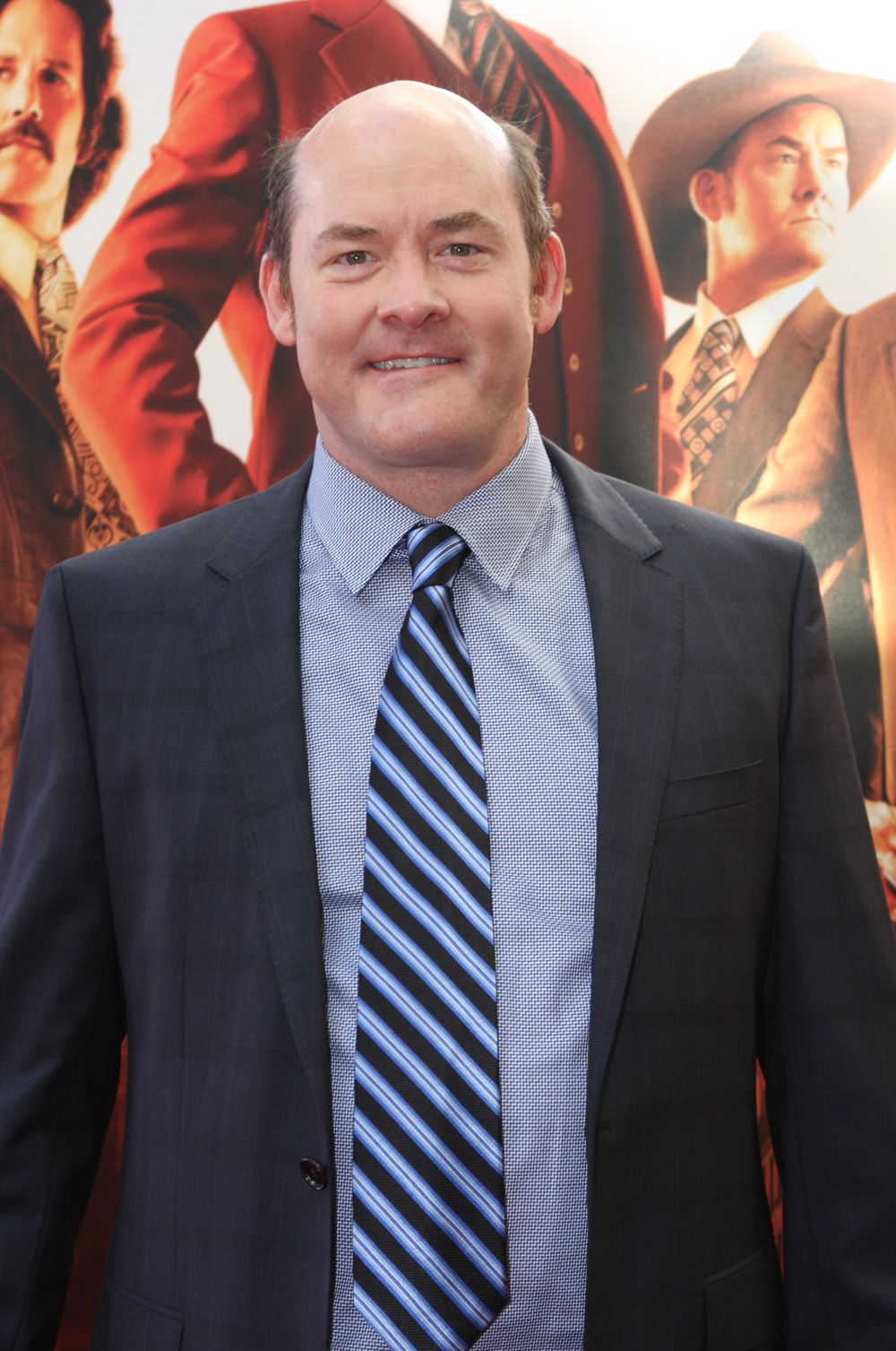
David Koechner

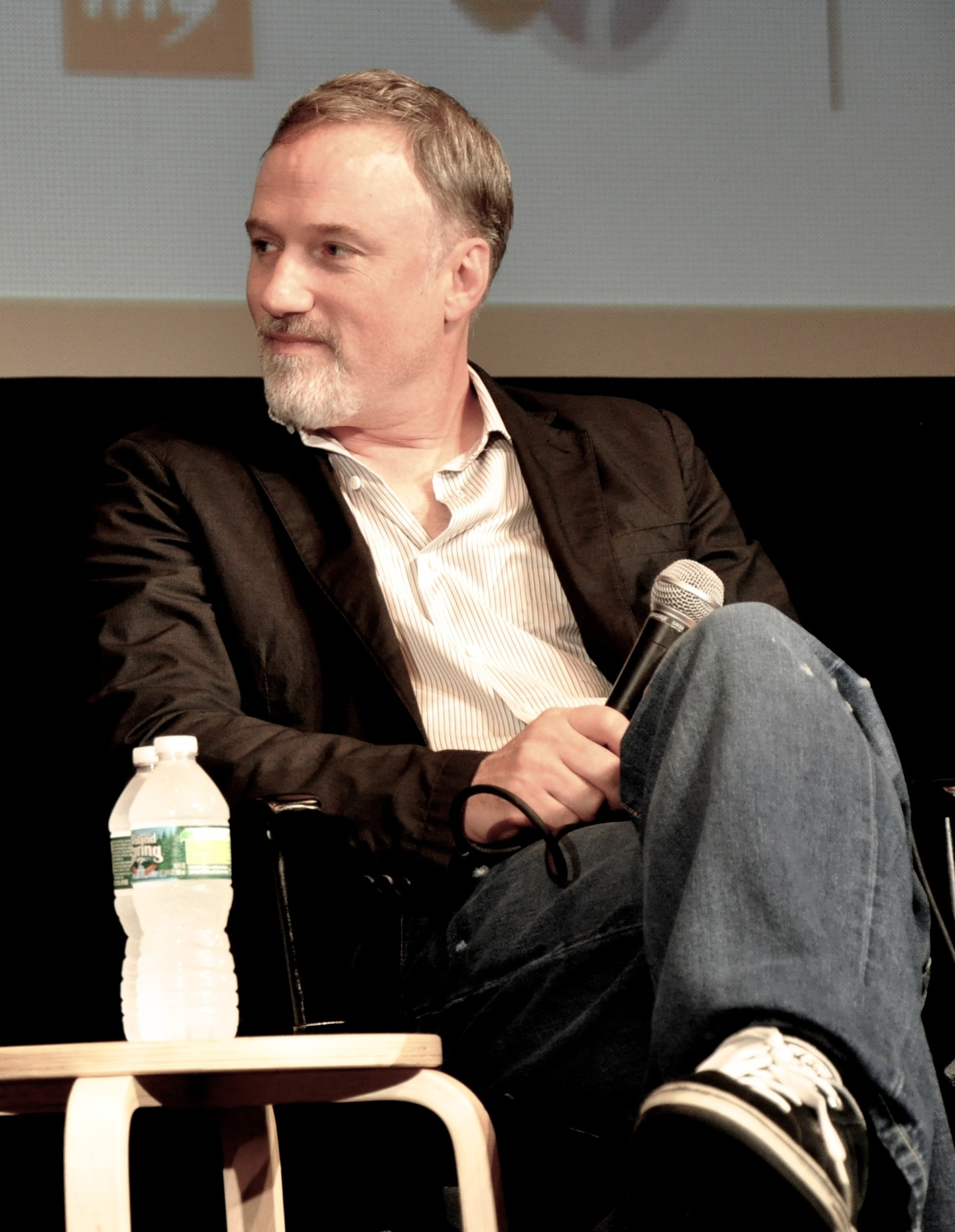
David Fincher

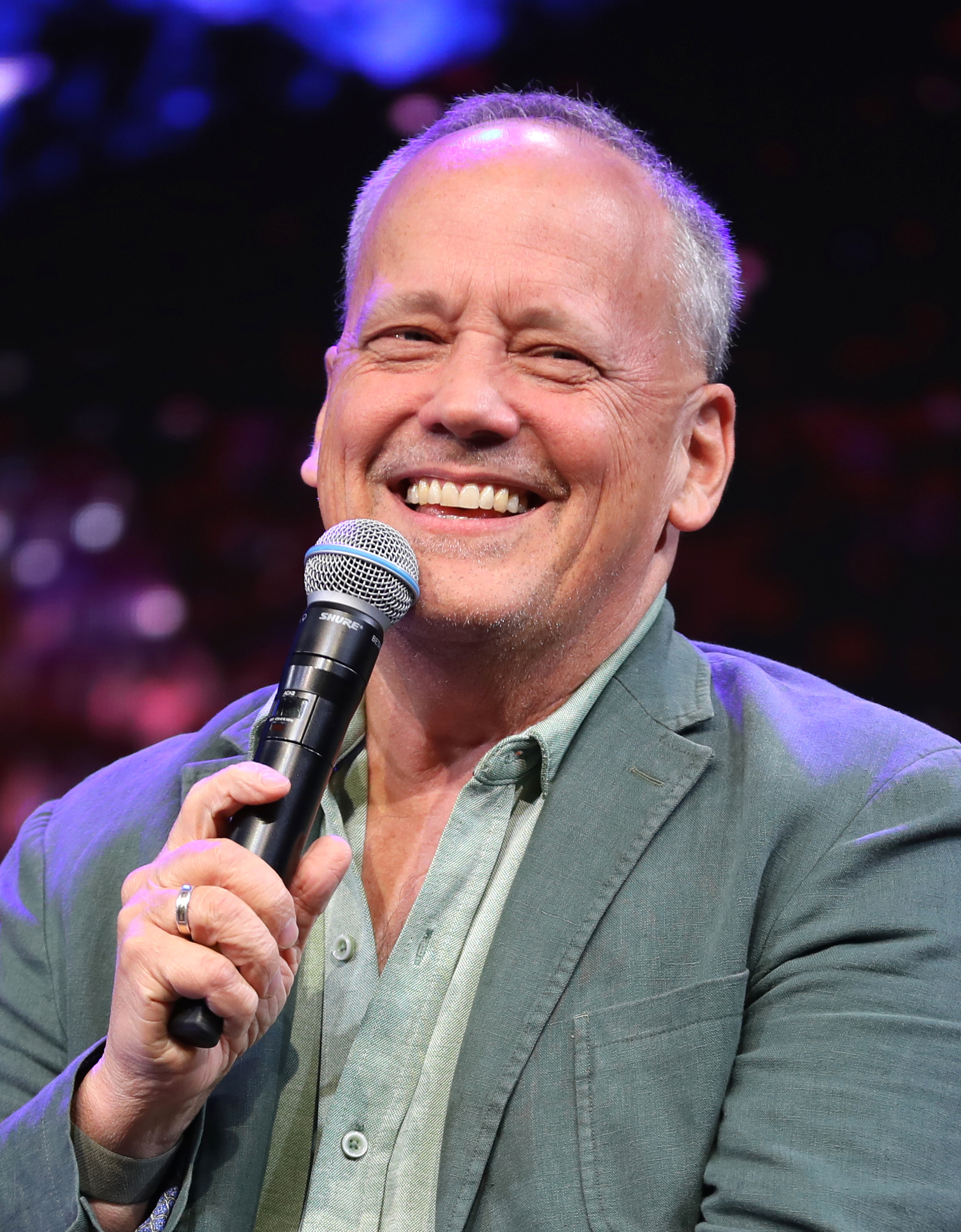
Dee Bradley Baker

- August 1
  - Robert Clift, British field hockey player
  - Jesse Borrego, American actor
  - Cesar Montano, Filipino actor
- August 4
  - Roger Clemens, American baseball player
  - Lori Lightfoot, African-American lawyer and politician
- August 5 – Patrick Ewing, Jamaican-born basketball player
- August 6 – Michelle Yeoh, Malaysian actress
- August 7 – Bruno Pelletier, Canadian singer
- August 8 – Yūji Machi, Japanese voice actor
- August 10 – Suzanne Collins, American television writer and author (The Hunger Games)
- August 11 – Rob Minkoff, American filmmaker
- August 12 – Ariel López Padilla, Mexican actor
- August 13
  - Marcello Novaes, Brazilian actor
  - John Slattery, American actor and film director
- August 15 – Tom Colicchio, American chef
- August 16
  - Ayub Bachchu, Bangladeshi singer-songwriter (d. 2018)
  - Steve Carell, American actor and comedian
- August 17 – Pierre Sanoussi-Bliss, German actor and director
- August 18 – Felipe Calderón, Mexican politician, 50th President of Mexico
- August 19
  - Valérie Kaprisky, French actress
  - Bernd Lucke, German politician and economist
- August 20 – James Marsters, American actor and musician
- August 21
  - Scott Bessent, 79th US Treasury Secretary
  - Tsutomu Miyazaki, Japanese serial killer (d. 2008)
  - Gilberto Santa Rosa, Puerto Rican salsa singer
- August 23 – Dean Karnazes, American ultramarathon runner
- August 24
  - David Koechner, American actor and comedian
  - Mary Ellen Weber, American astronaut
- August 25 – Theresa Andrews, American swimmer
- August 26
  - Roger Kingdom, American hurdler
  - Princess Lalla Meryem of Morocco
- August 28 – David Fincher, American director and producer
- August 29
  - Jutta Kleinschmidt, German rally driver
  - Lycia Naff, American actress and journalist
  - Richard Angelo, American 'angel-of-death' serial killer
- August 30 – Alexander Litvinenko, Russian ex-KGB colonel and ex-FSB lieutenant-colonel (d. 2006)
- August 31
  - Dee Bradley Baker, American comedian, announcer and voice artist
  - Mark L. Walberg, American television personality and show host

=== September ===
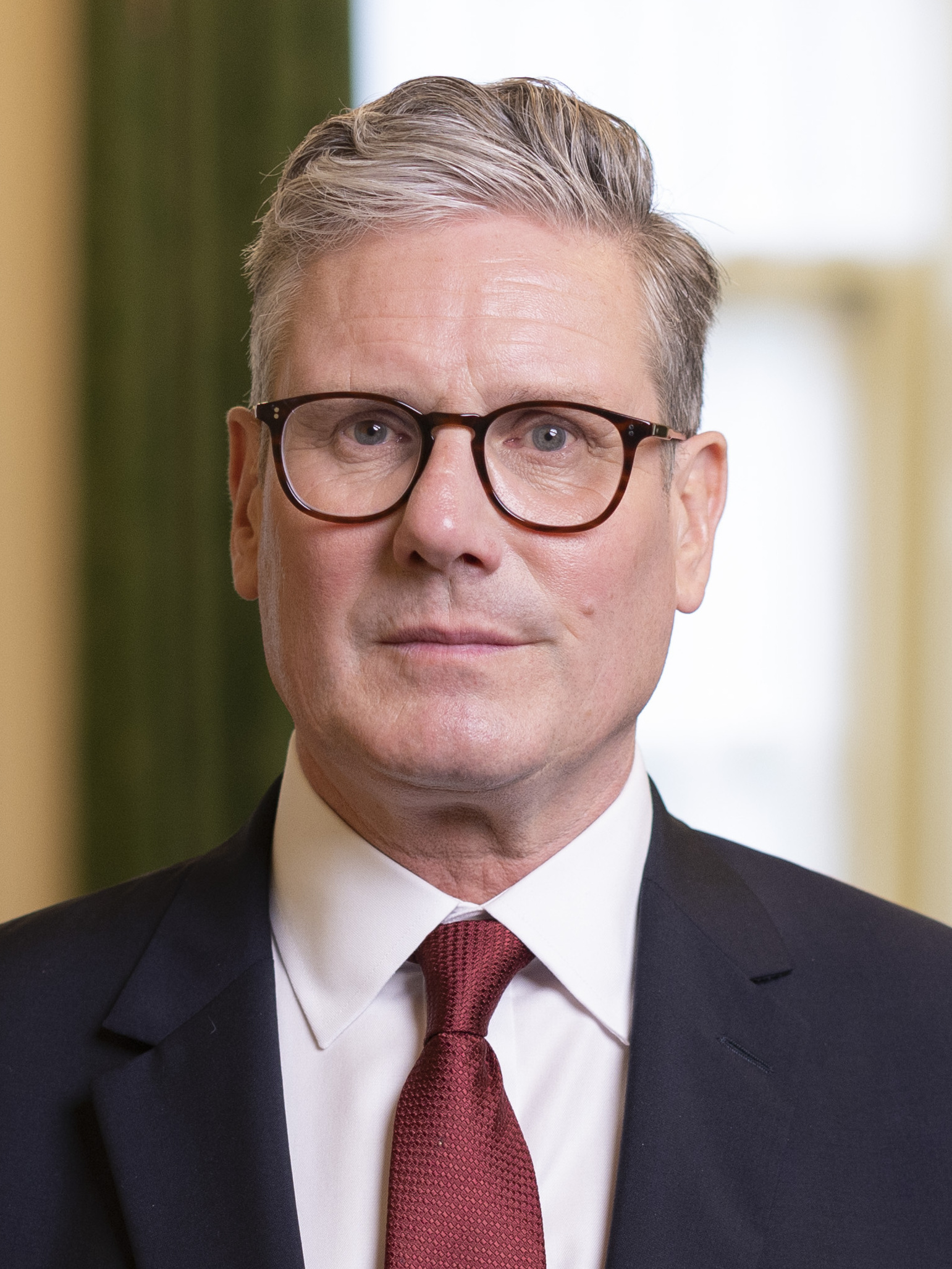
Keir Starmer

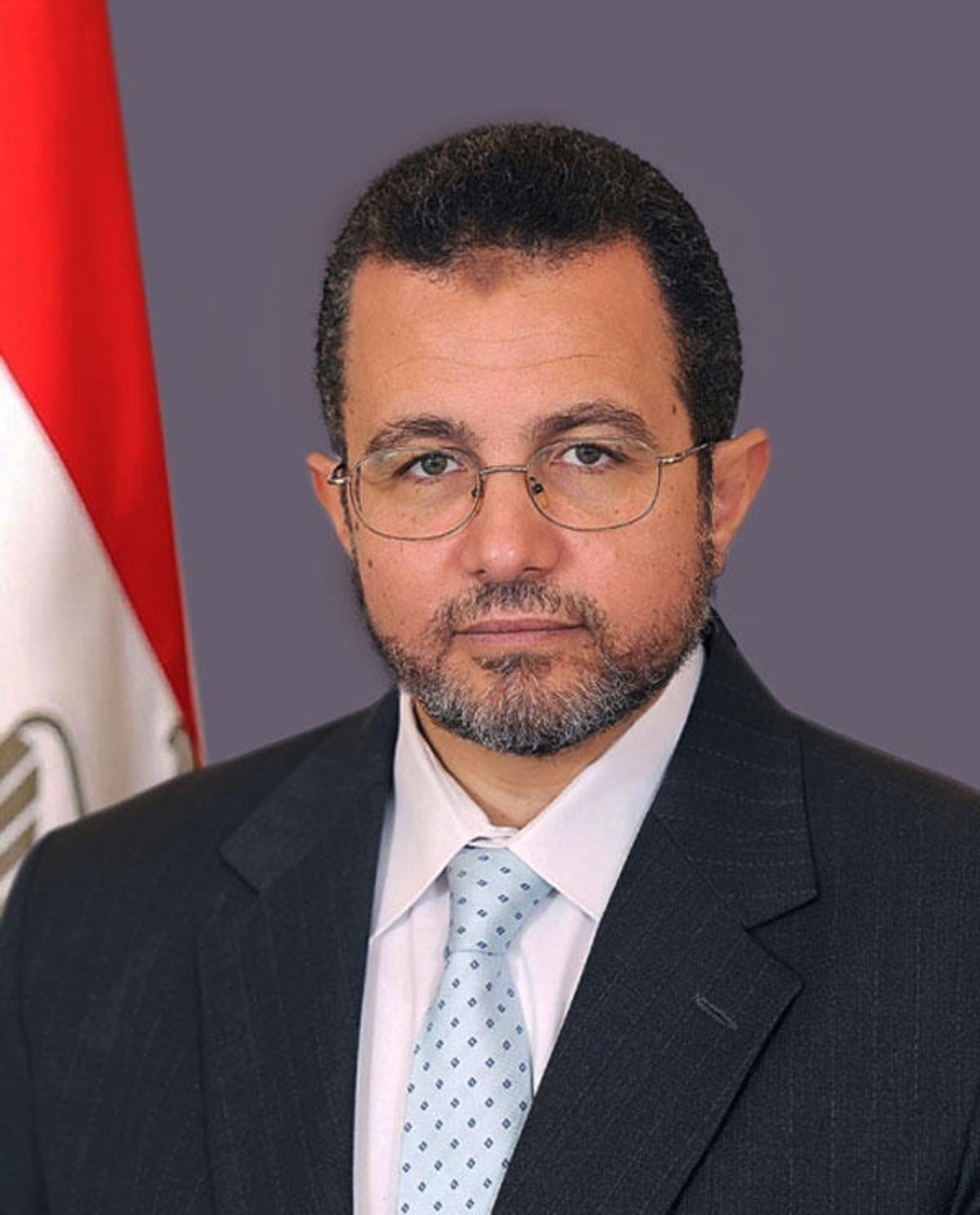
Hesham Qandil

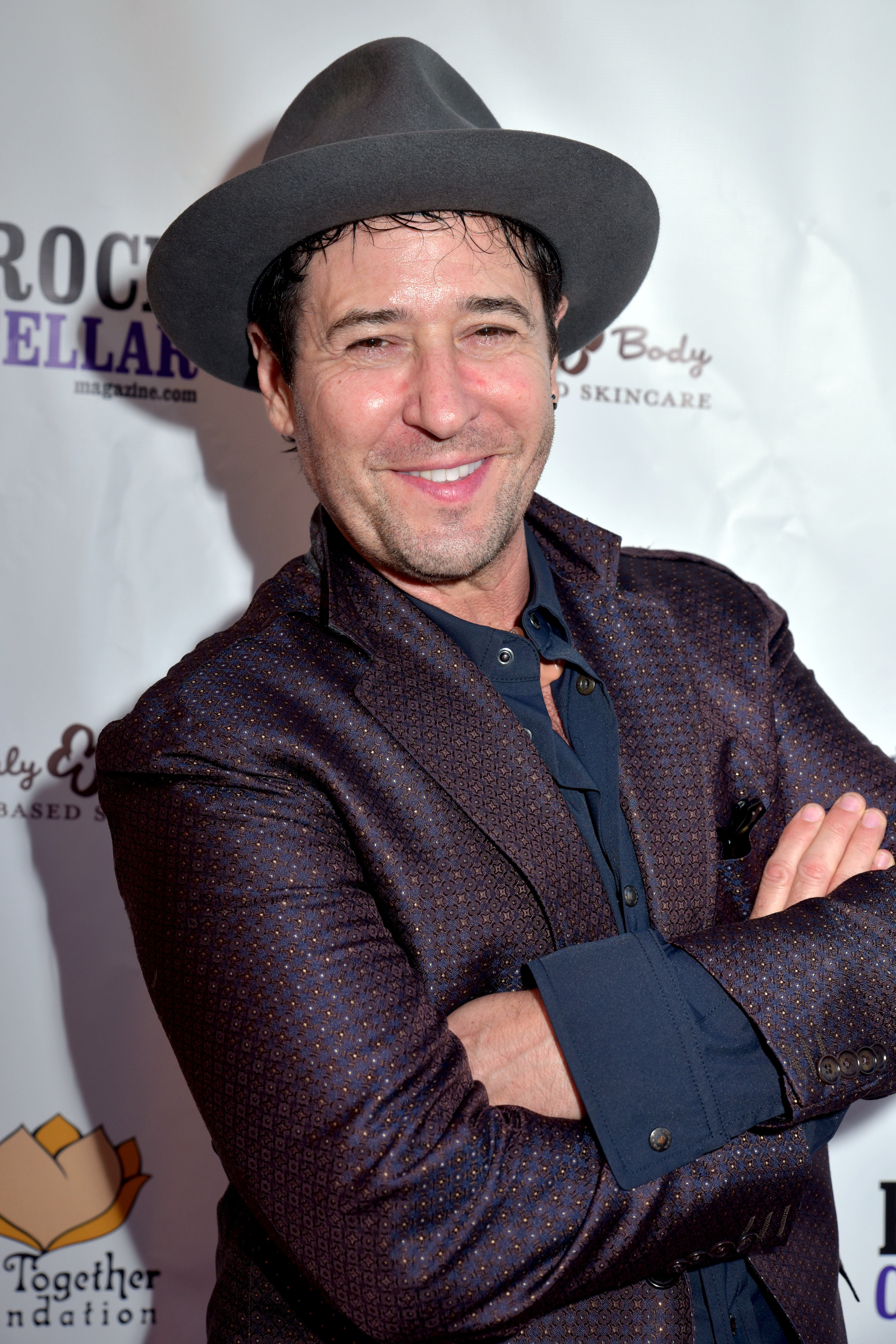
Rob Morrow

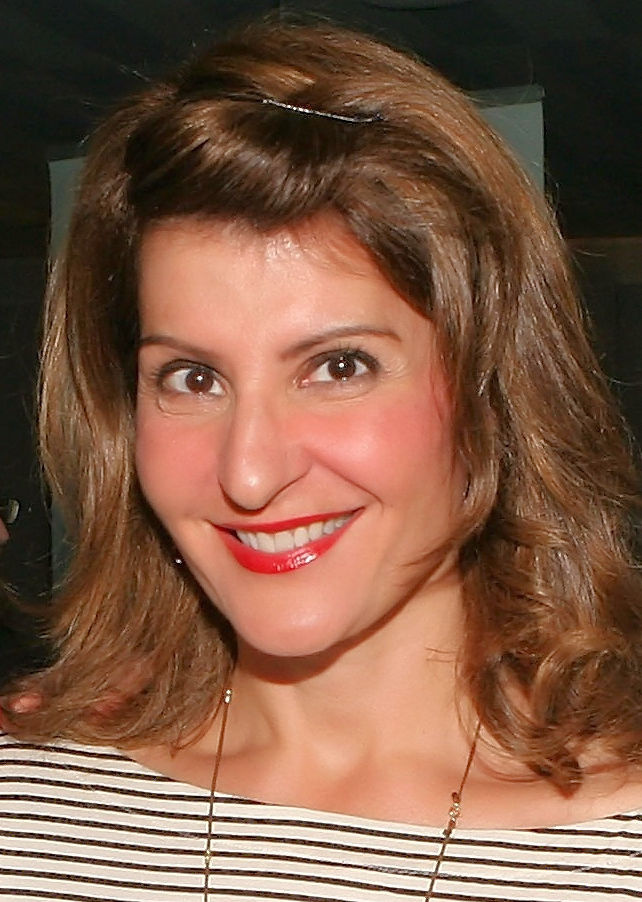
Nia Vardalos

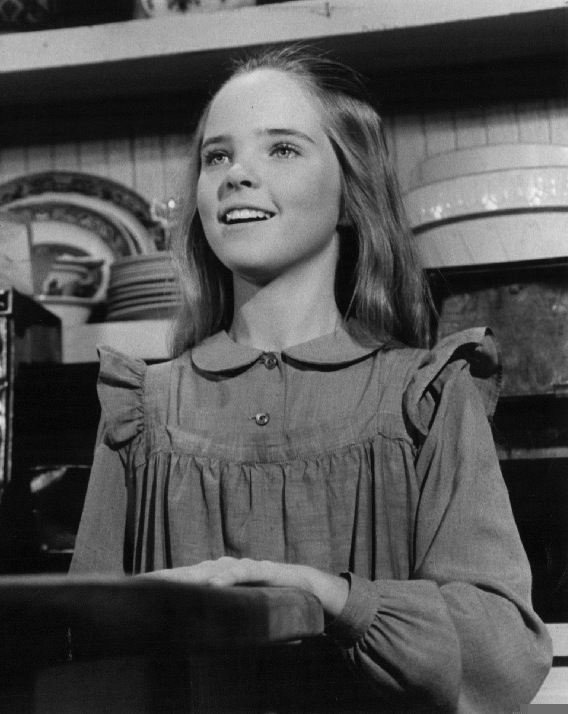
Melissa Sue Anderson

- September 1 – Ruud Gullit, Dutch footballer
- September 2 – Keir Starmer, British politician, Prime Minister of the United Kingdom
- September 4 – Shinya Yamanaka, Japanese physician and researcher
- September 8
  - Thomas Kretschmann, German actor
  - Miss Amy (Amy Otey), American musical fitness singer-songwriter
  - Al Pardo, Spanish-born American baseball catcher
  - Jay Ziskrout, American punk rock drummer
- September 11
  - Kristy McNichol, American actress
  - Victoria Poleva, Ukrainian composer
  - Antoine Rostand, French businessman
- September 12 – Dino Merlin, Bosnian singer-songwriter, musician and producer
- September 13 – Hisao Egawa, Japanese voice actor
- September 15 – François Bloemhof, South African author
- September 17
  - Baz Luhrmann, Australian film director
  - Hesham Qandil, 51st Prime Minister of Egypt
- September 19
  - Shaharuddin Badaruddin, Malaysian politician (d. 2018)
  - Cheri Oteri, American comic actress
  - Gottfried von Bismarck, German aristocrat and socialite (d. 2007)
- September 20 – Vittorio De Angelis, Italian voice actor (d. 2015)
- September 21 – Rob Morrow, American actor
- September 22 – Martin Crowe, New Zealand cricketer (d. 2016)
- September 24
  - Rosamund Kwan, Hong Kong actress
  - Ally McCoist, Scottish footballer and pundit
  - Nia Vardalos, Canadian-American actress
- September 25
  - Ales Bialiatski, Belarusian human rights campaigner, Nobel Prize laureate
  - Aida Turturro, American actress
- September 26
  - Melissa Sue Anderson, American actress
  - Anabel Ferreira, Mexican actress/comedian
  - Steve Moneghetti, Australian long-distance runner
  - Chunky Pandey, Indian actor
- September 28 – Grant Fuhr, Canadian hockey player
- September 30 – Frank Rijkaard, Dutch football player and manager

=== October ===
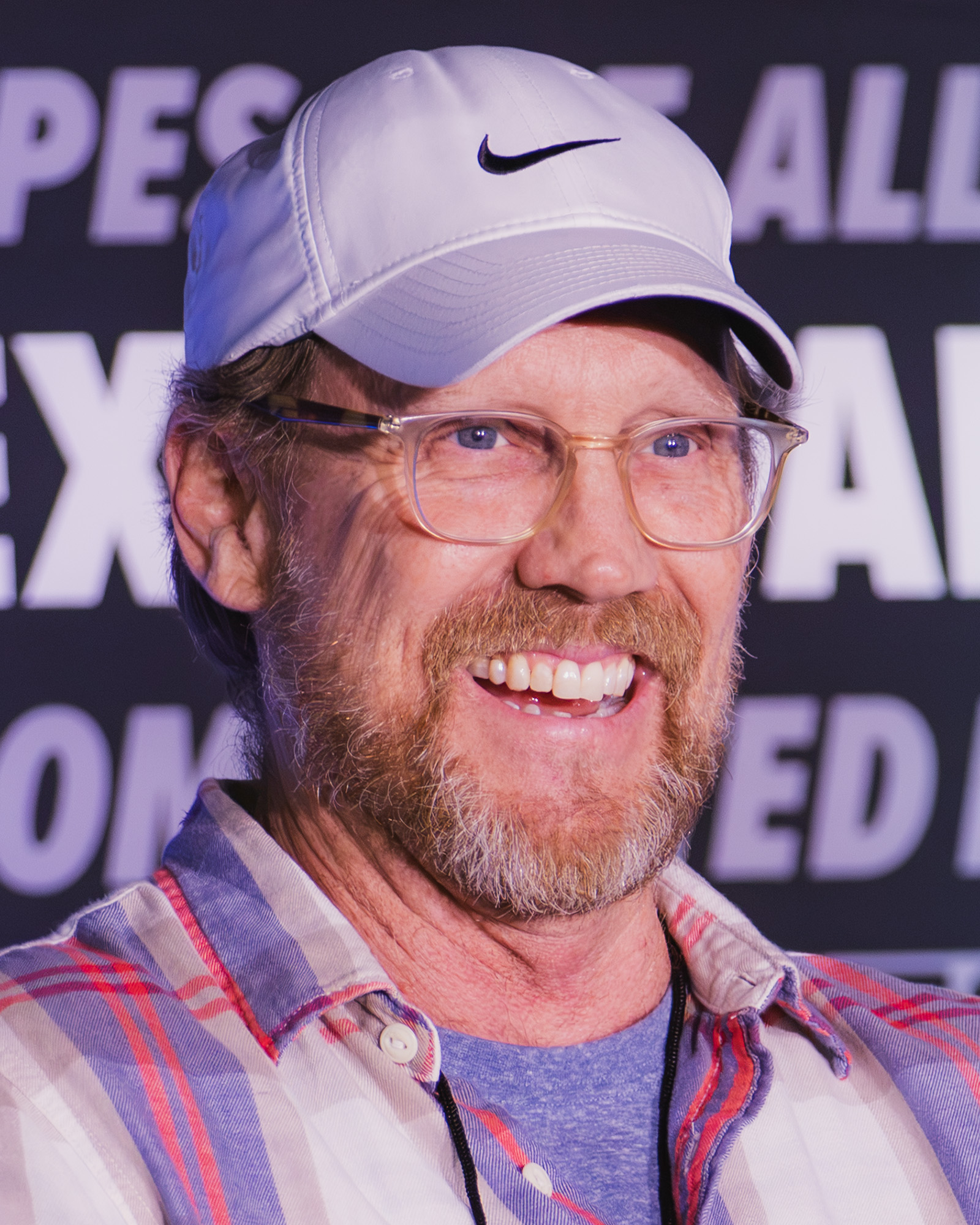
Jeff Bennett

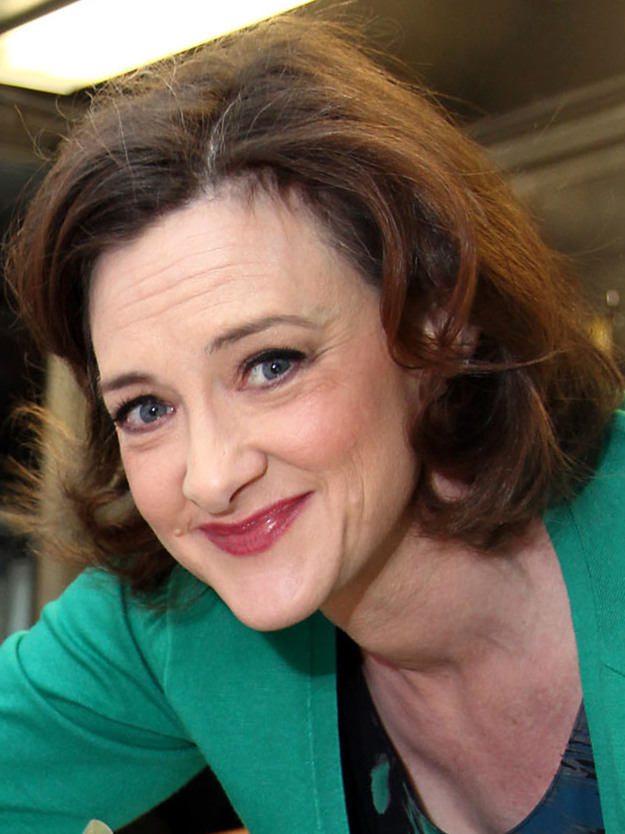
Joan Cusack

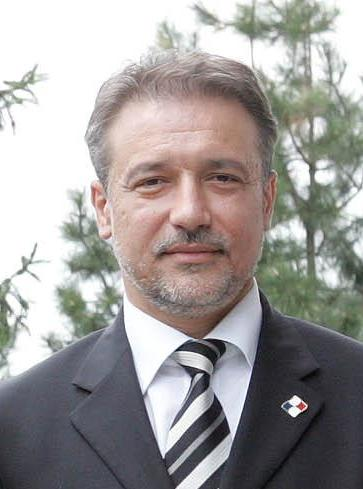
Branko Crvenkovski

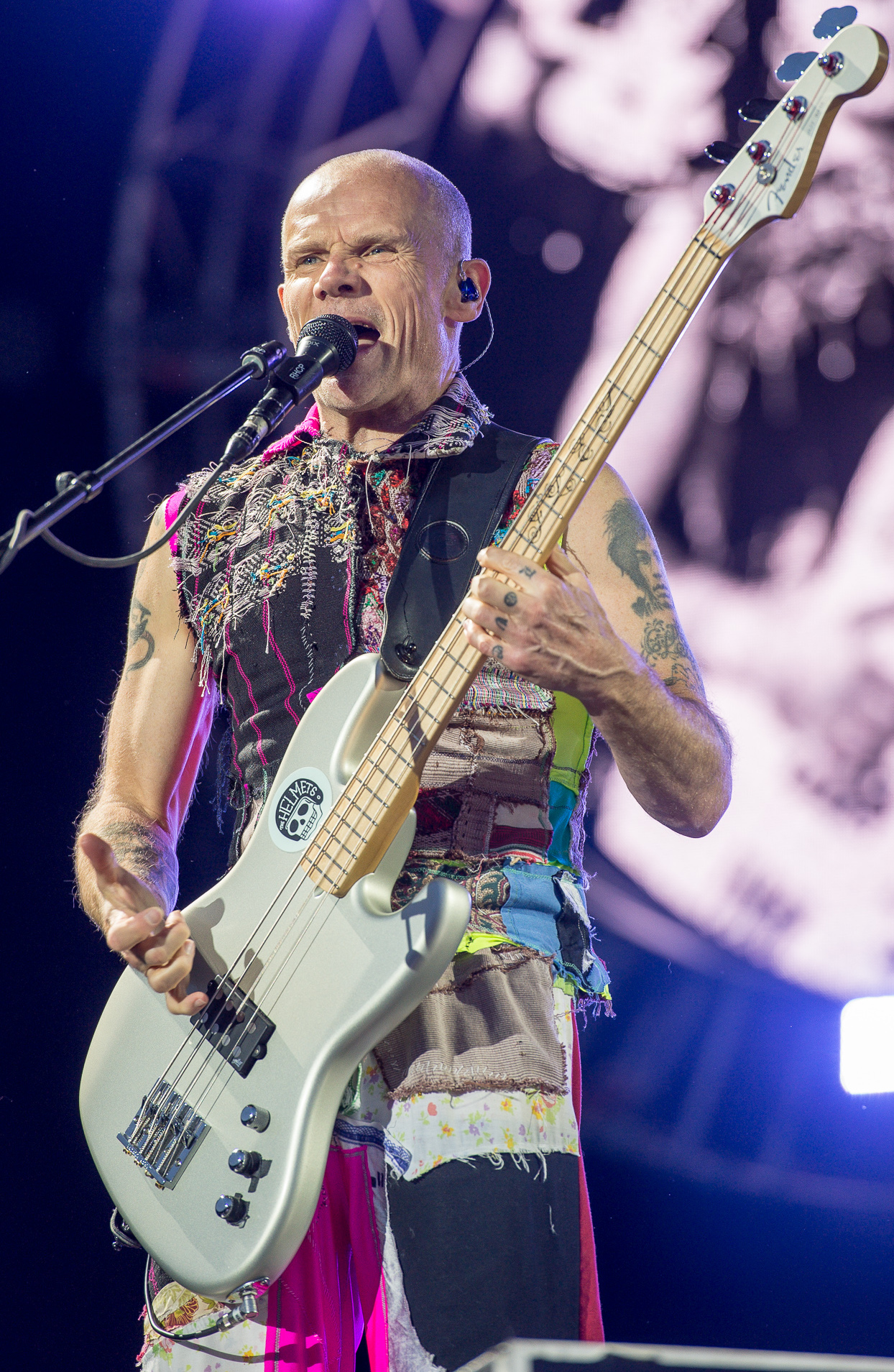
Flea

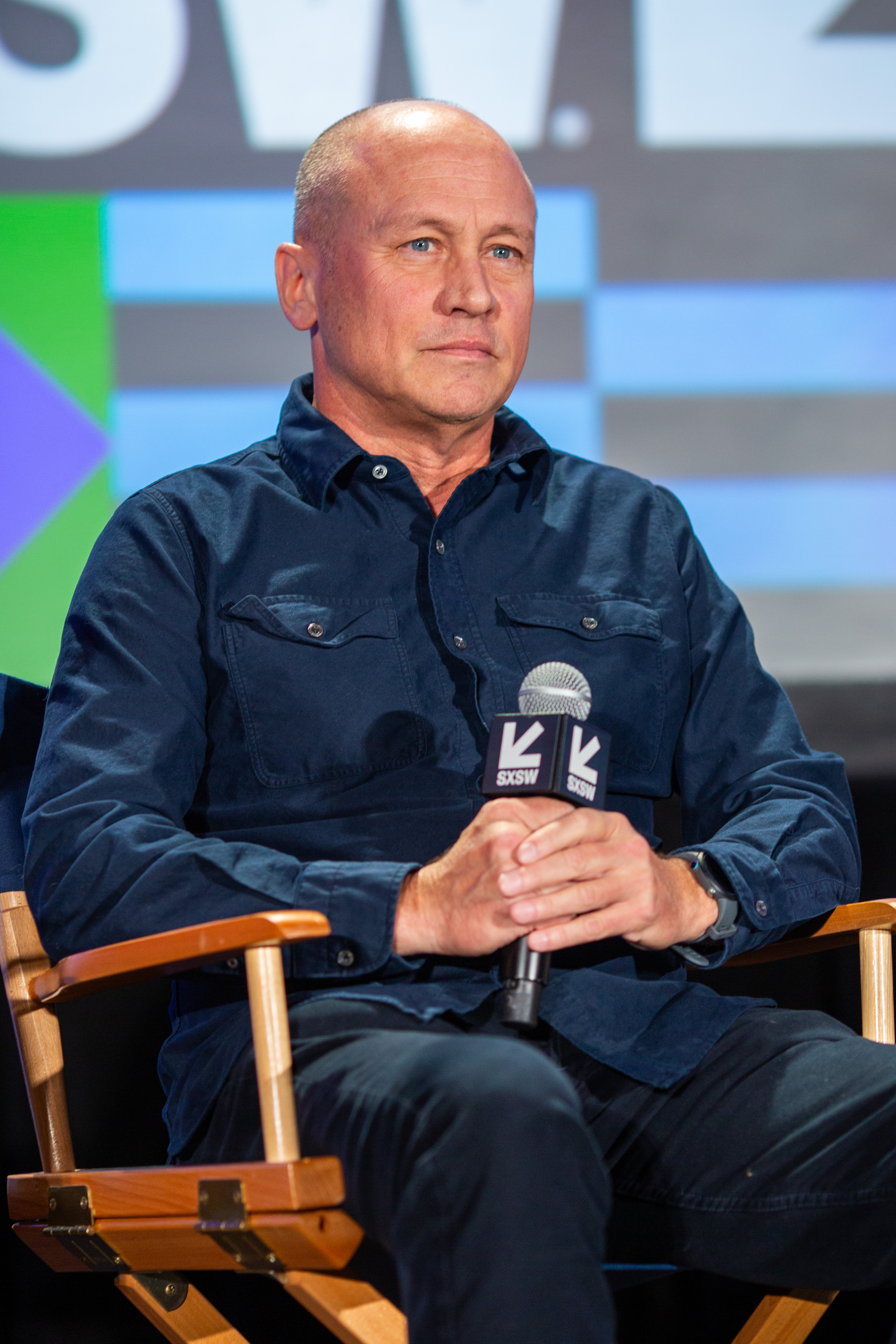
Mike Judge

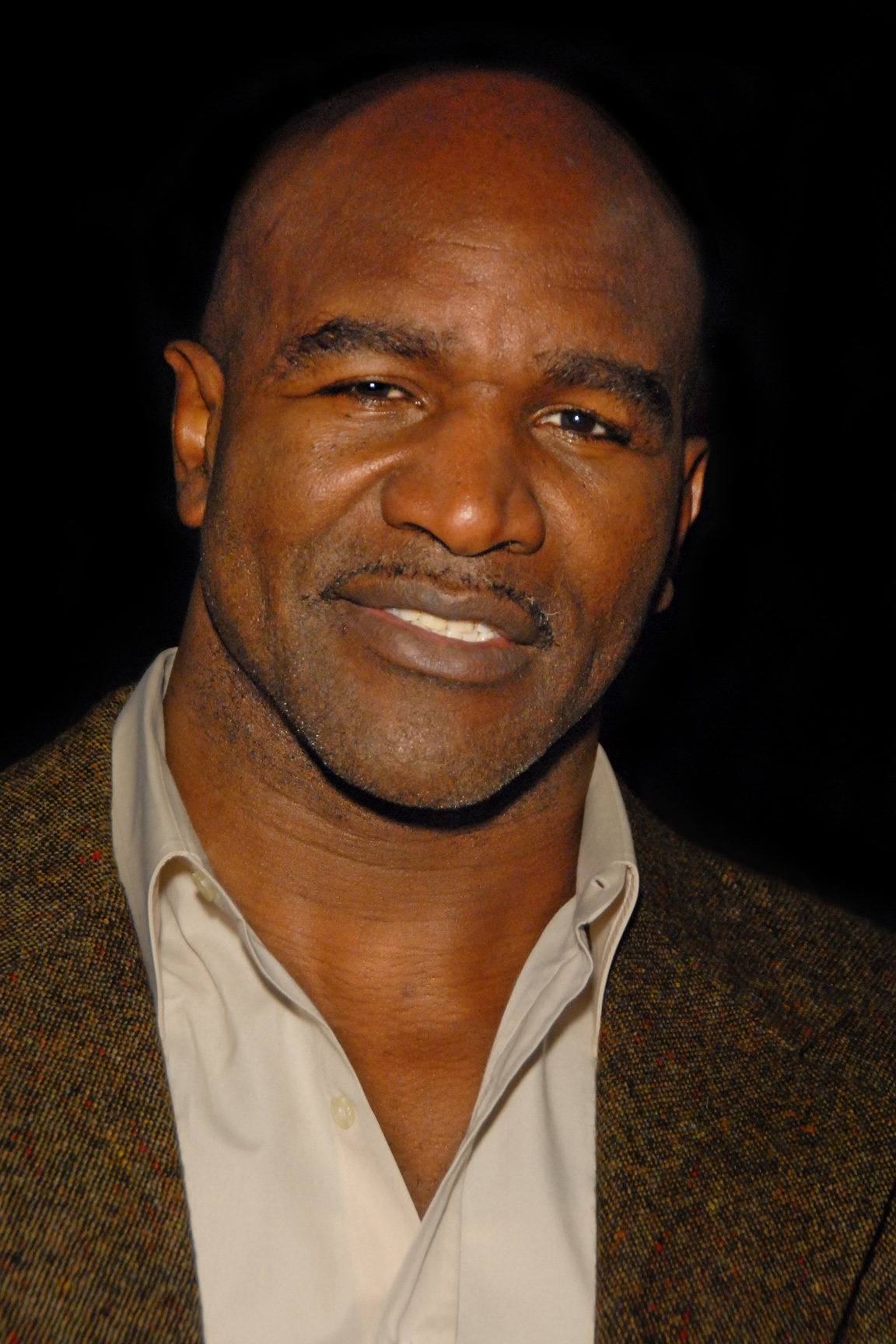
Evander Holyfield

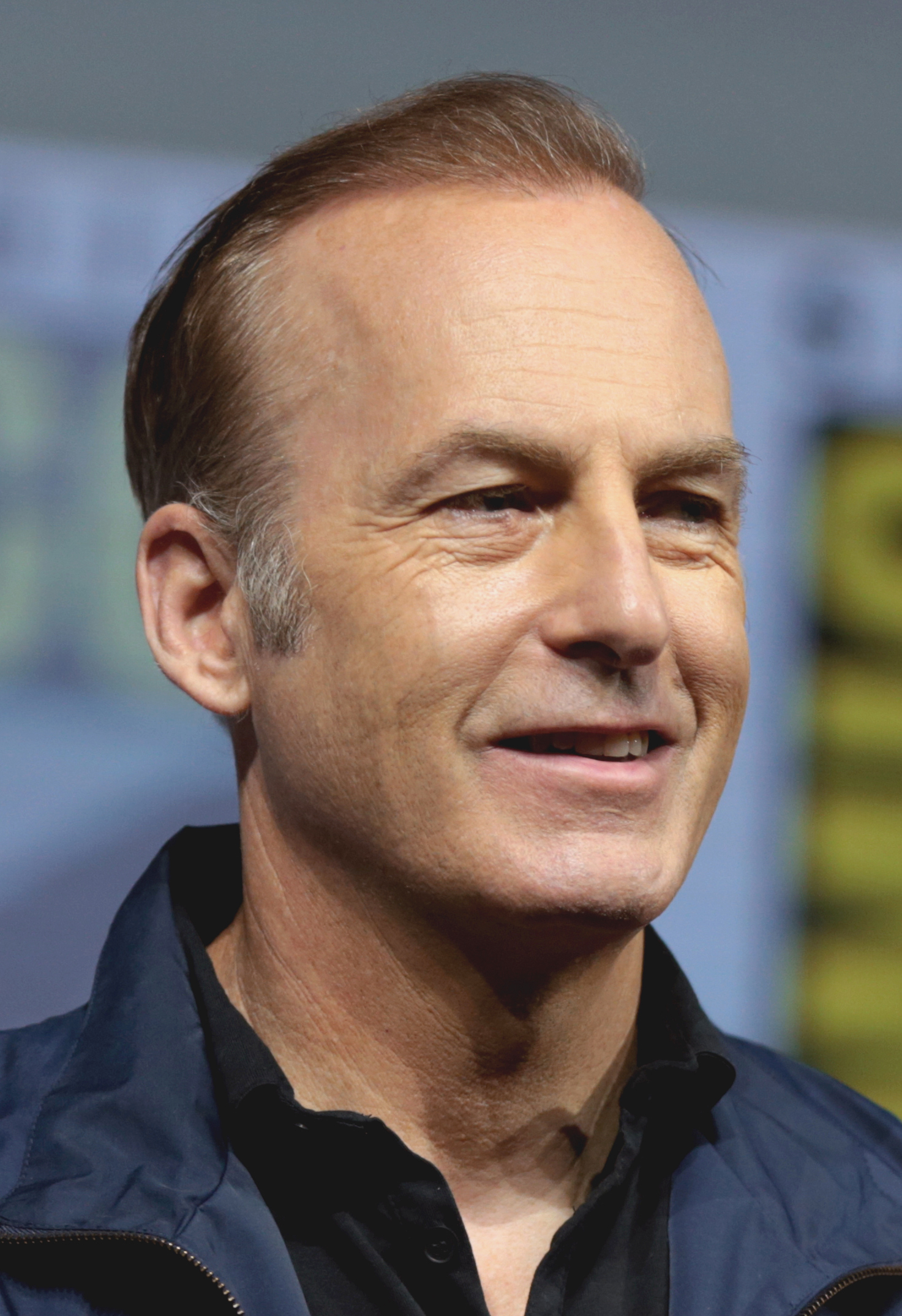
Bob Odenkirk

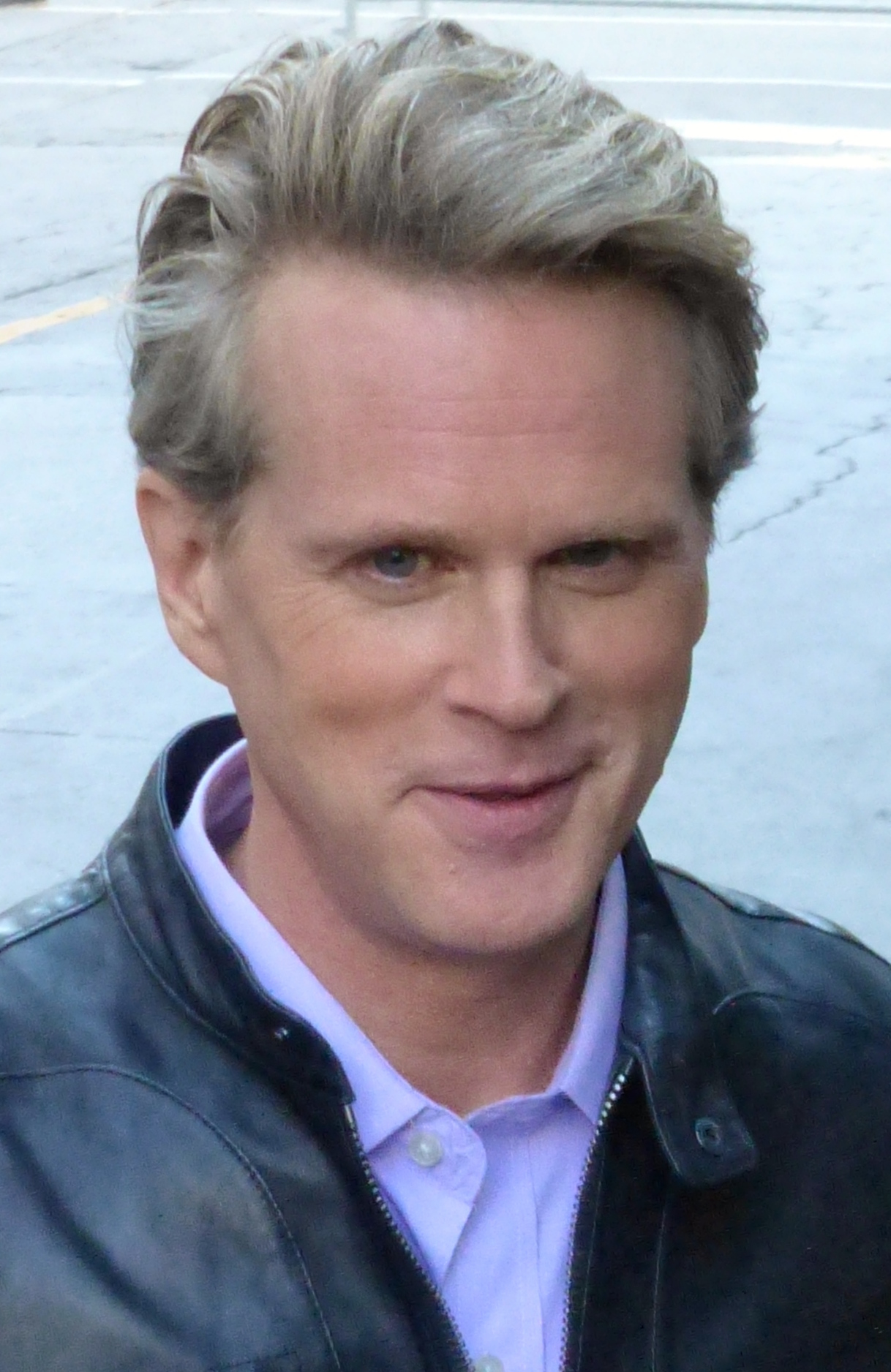
Cary Elwes

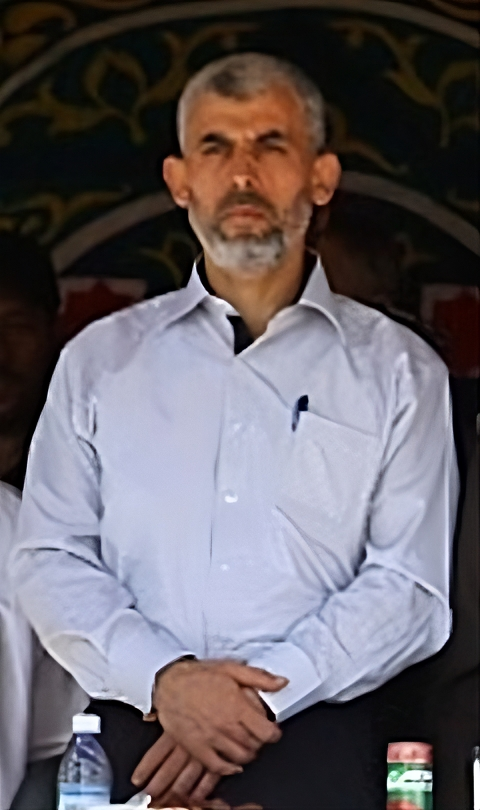
Yahya Sinwar

- October 1
  - Esai Morales, American actor
  - Fernando Albán Salazar, Venezuelan lawyer and politician (d. 2018)
- October 2
  - Jeff Bennett, American voice actor and singer
  - Tawfiq Titingan, Malaysian politician (d. 2018)
- October 3 – Tommy Lee, American rock musician and drummer
- October 5 – Michael Andretti, American race car driver
- October 11 – Joan Cusack, American actress and comedian
- October 12
  - Carlos Bernard, American actor
  - Branko Crvenkovski, President of Macedonia
- October 13
  - Margareth Menezes, Brazilian singer
  - Kelly Preston, American actress (d. 2020)
  - Jerry Rice, American football player
- October 14
  - Shahar Perkiss, Israeli tennis player
- October 16
  - Manute Bol, Sudanese basketball player and activist (d. 2010)
  - Flea, Australian-American actor and musician
  - Dmitri Hvorostovsky, Russian baritone (d. 2017)
  - Tamara McKinney, American alpine skier
- October 17 – Mike Judge, American actor, voice actor, animator, writer, producer, director and musician
- October 18
  - Young Kim, American politician
  - Min Ko Naing, Burmese Democratic activist and dissident
- October 19
  - Tracy Chevalier, American author
  - Evander Holyfield, American boxer
- October 20 – Anatoly Khrapaty, Soviet Olympic weightlifter (d. 2008)
- October 21
  - Miki Itō, Japanese voice actress
  - David Campese, Australian rugby union player
- October 22 – Bob Odenkirk, American actor and comedian
- October 25
  - David Furnish, Canadian filmmaker, director and producer
  - Darlene Vogel, American actress
- October 26
  - Cary Elwes, English actor and writer
  - Riorita Paterău, Moldovan politician
- October 27
  - Jun'ichi Kanemaru, Japanese voice actor
  - Ang Peng Siong, Singaporean sportsman
- October 28 – Daphne Zuniga, American actress
- October 29
  - Debra Sandlund, American actress
  - Yahya Sinwar,(Hamas political leader) (d 2024)
- October 30
  - Stefan Kuntz, German football player and coach
  - Courtney Walsh, West Indian cricketer

=== November ===
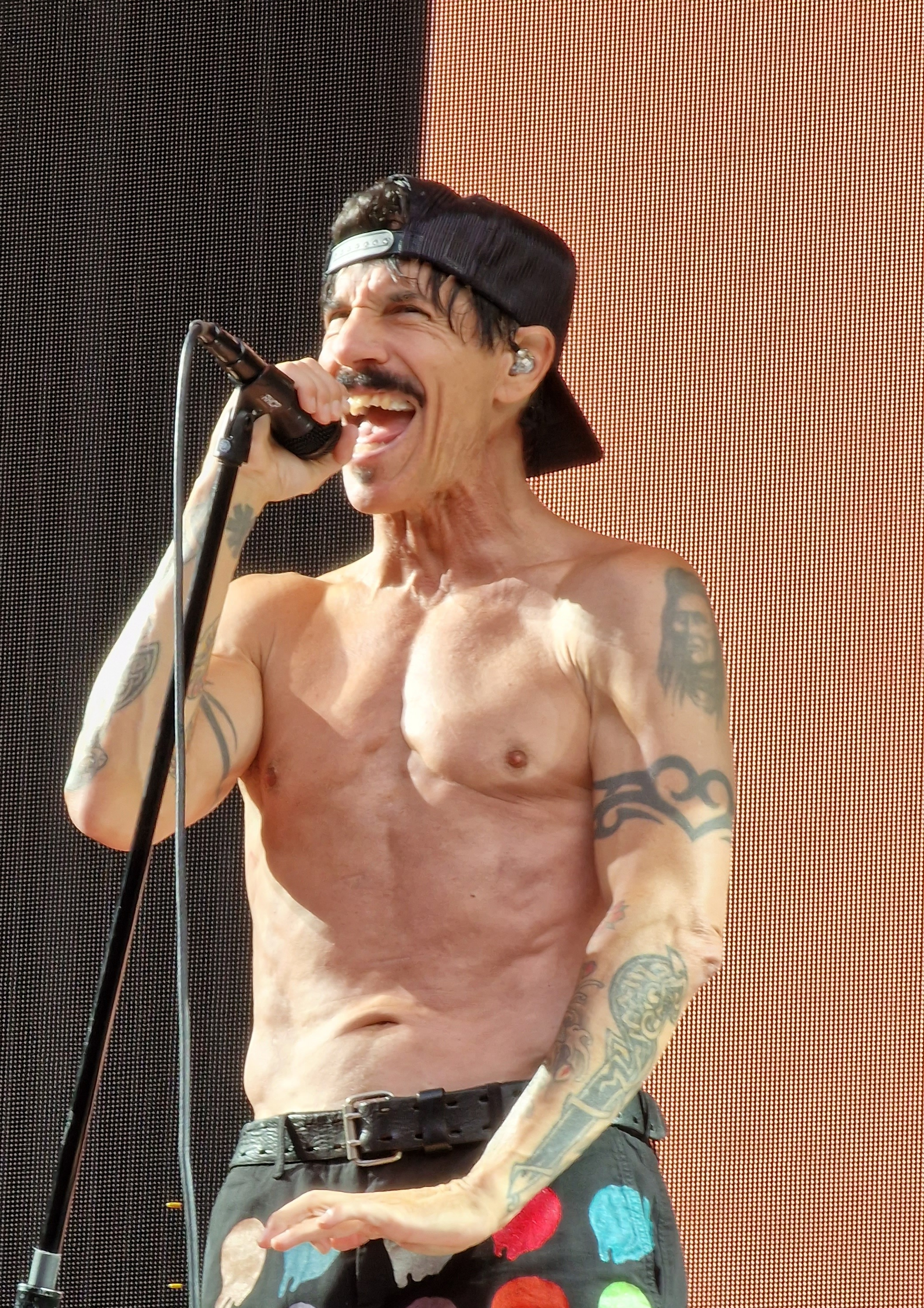
Anthony Kiedis

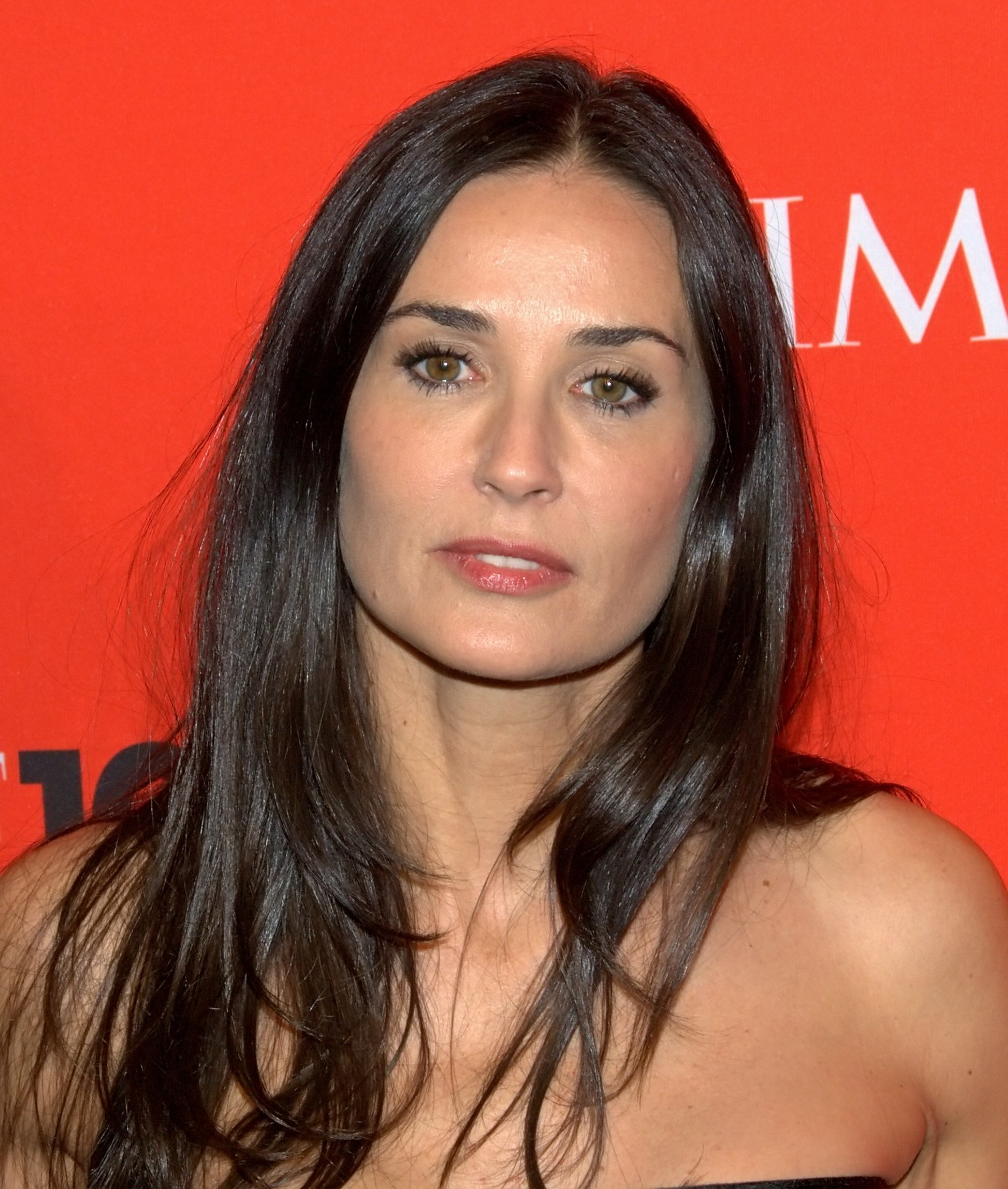
Demi Moore

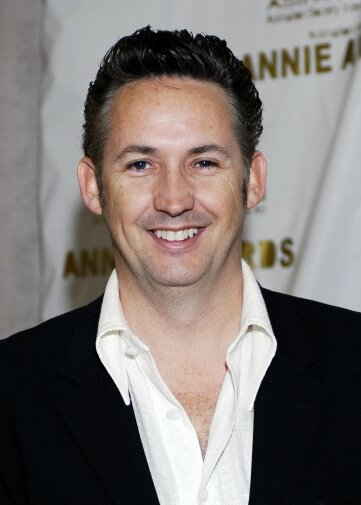
Harland Williams

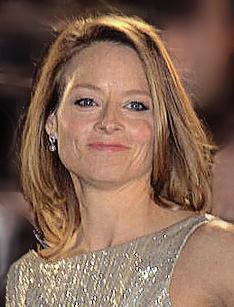
Jodie Foster

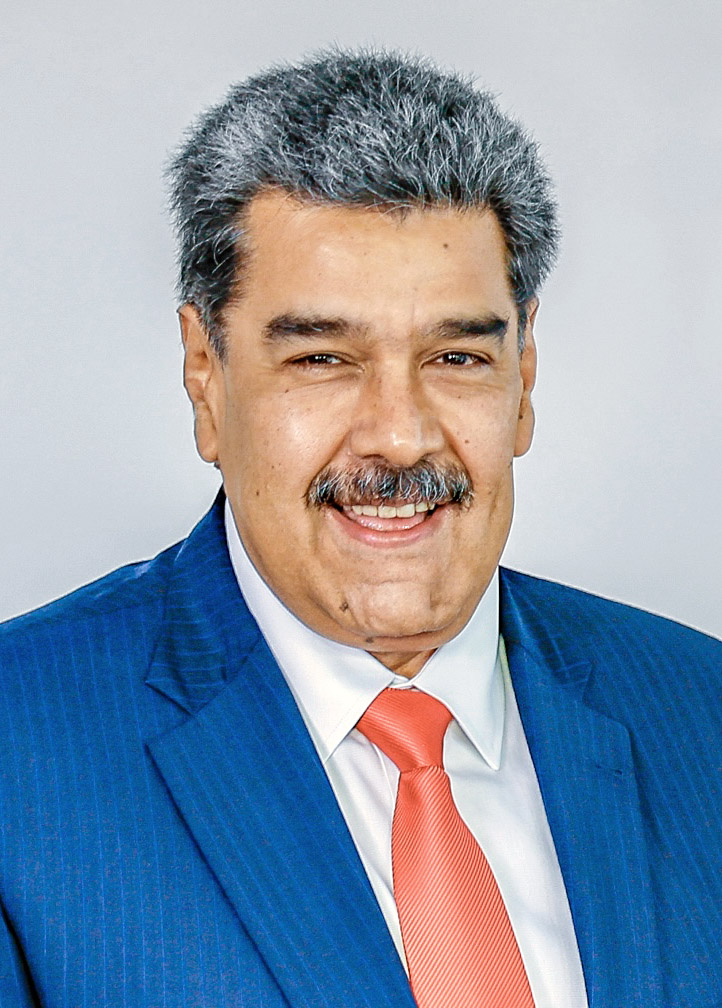
Nicolás Maduro

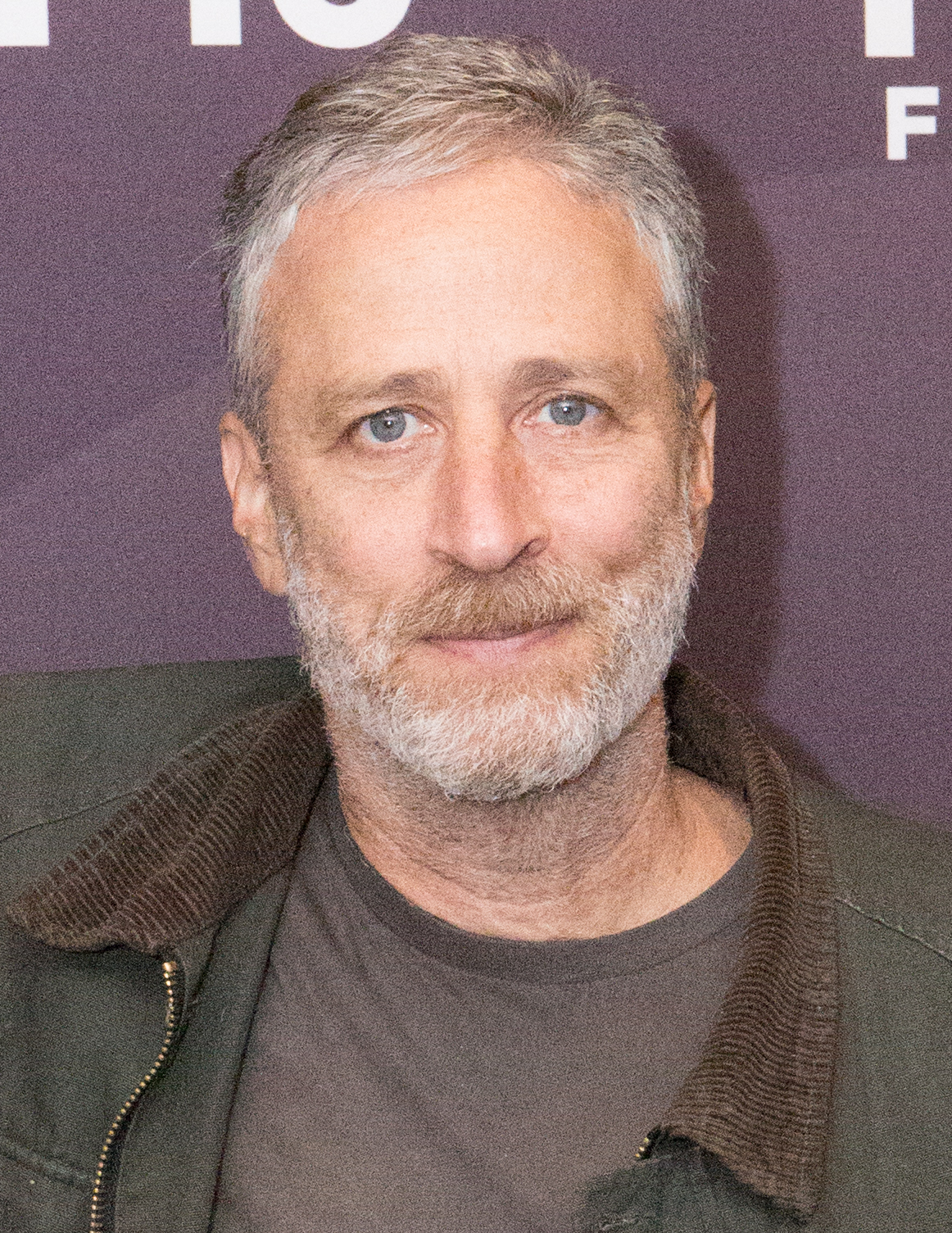
Jon Stewart

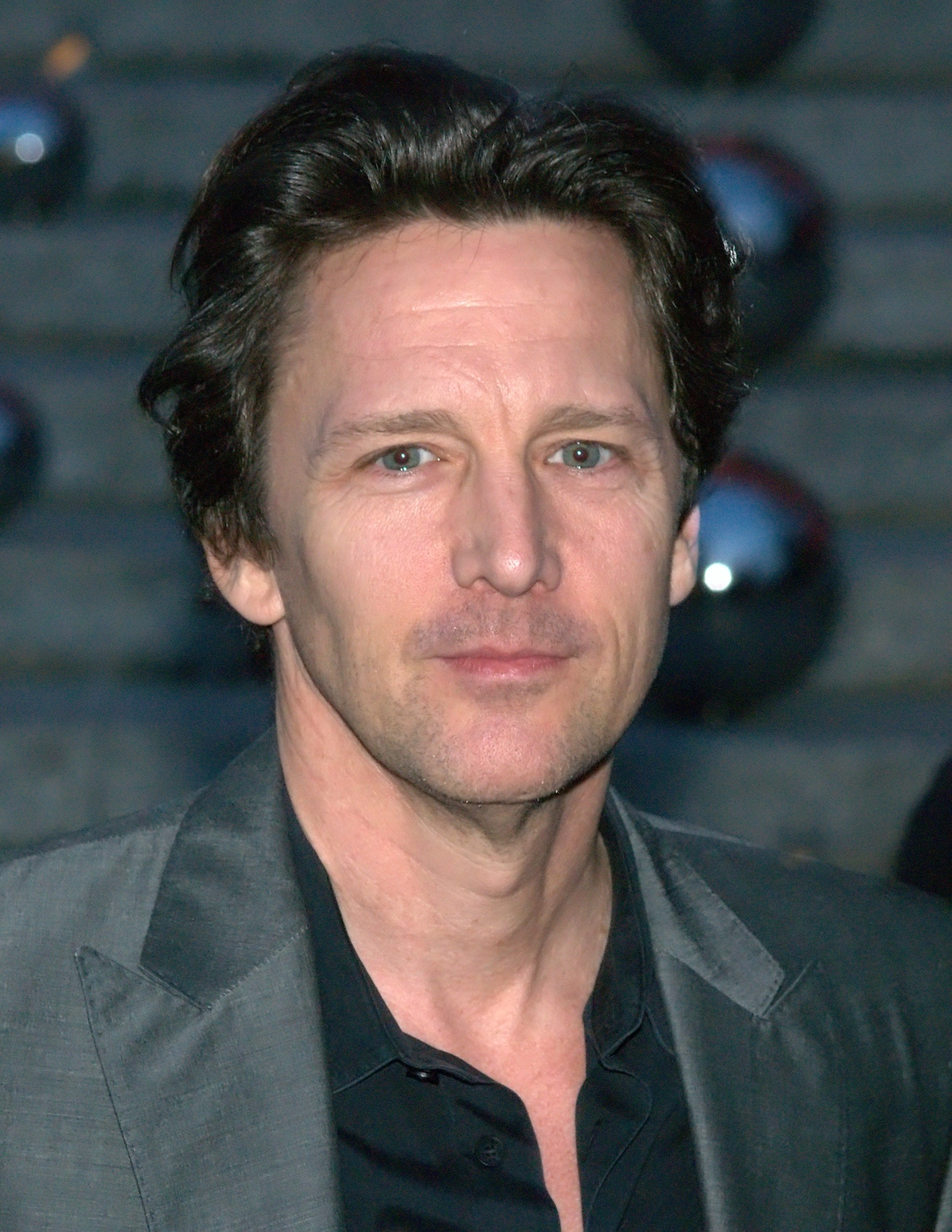
Andrew McCarthy

- November 1
  - Sharron Davies, British swimmer/television presenter
  - Nadica Dreven Budinski, Croatian politician
  - Magne Furuholmen, Norwegian musician (A-ha)
  - Anthony Kiedis, American rock singer (Red Hot Chili Peppers)
- November 2 – Marcellin Nadeau, French politician
- November 3
  - Phil Katz, American computer programmer (d. 2000)
  - Gabe Newell, American business executive
- November 6
  - Nadezhda Kuzhelnaya, Russian pilot and cosmonaut
  - Aznil Nawawi, Malaysian television host
- November 7 – Bettina Hoy, German equestrienne
- November 9 – Dolores Delgado, Spanish politician and prosecutor
- November 11
  - Mic Michaeli, Swedish keyboardist (Europe)
  - Demi Moore, American actress
  - Nicole P. Stott, American astronaut
- November 12
  - Neal Shusterman, American author
  - Naomi Wolf, American author, feminist and political consultant
- November 13 – Steve Altes, American humorist
- November 14
  - Miriem Bensalah-Chaqroun, Moroccan businesswoman
  - Laura San Giacomo, American actress
  - Atsuko Tanaka, Japanese voice actress (d. 2024)
  - Harland Williams, Canadian-American actor and comedian
- November 16 – Maria Helena Doering Colombian actress
- November 17 – Jamie Moyer, American baseball player
- November 18 – Kirk Hammett, American guitarist (Metallica)
- November 19 – Jodie Foster, American actress and director
- November 21 – Steven Curtis Chapman, American Christian musician
- November 22 – Sumi Jo, Korean operatic soprano
- November 23
  - Assim Al-Hakeem, Saudi cleric
  - Nicolás Maduro, 63rd President of Venezuela
- November 24 – John Kovalic, American cartoonist
- November 27
  - Charlie Benante, American drummer
  - Mike Bordin, American drummer
  - Marumi Shiraishi, Japanese actress
  - Davey Boy Smith, British professional wrestler (d. 2002)
- November 28
  - Jane Sibbett, American actress and producer
  - Jon Stewart, American actor, comedian, media critic and television personality, host of The Daily Show (1999–2015)
- November 29 – Andrew McCarthy, American actor
- November 30 – Bo Jackson, American football and baseball player

=== December ===
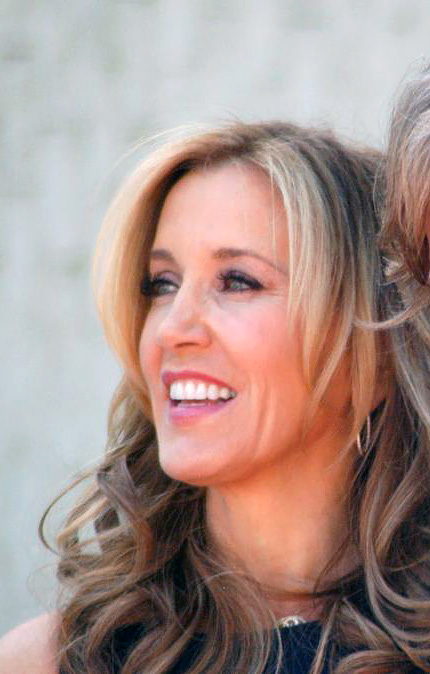
Felicity Huffman

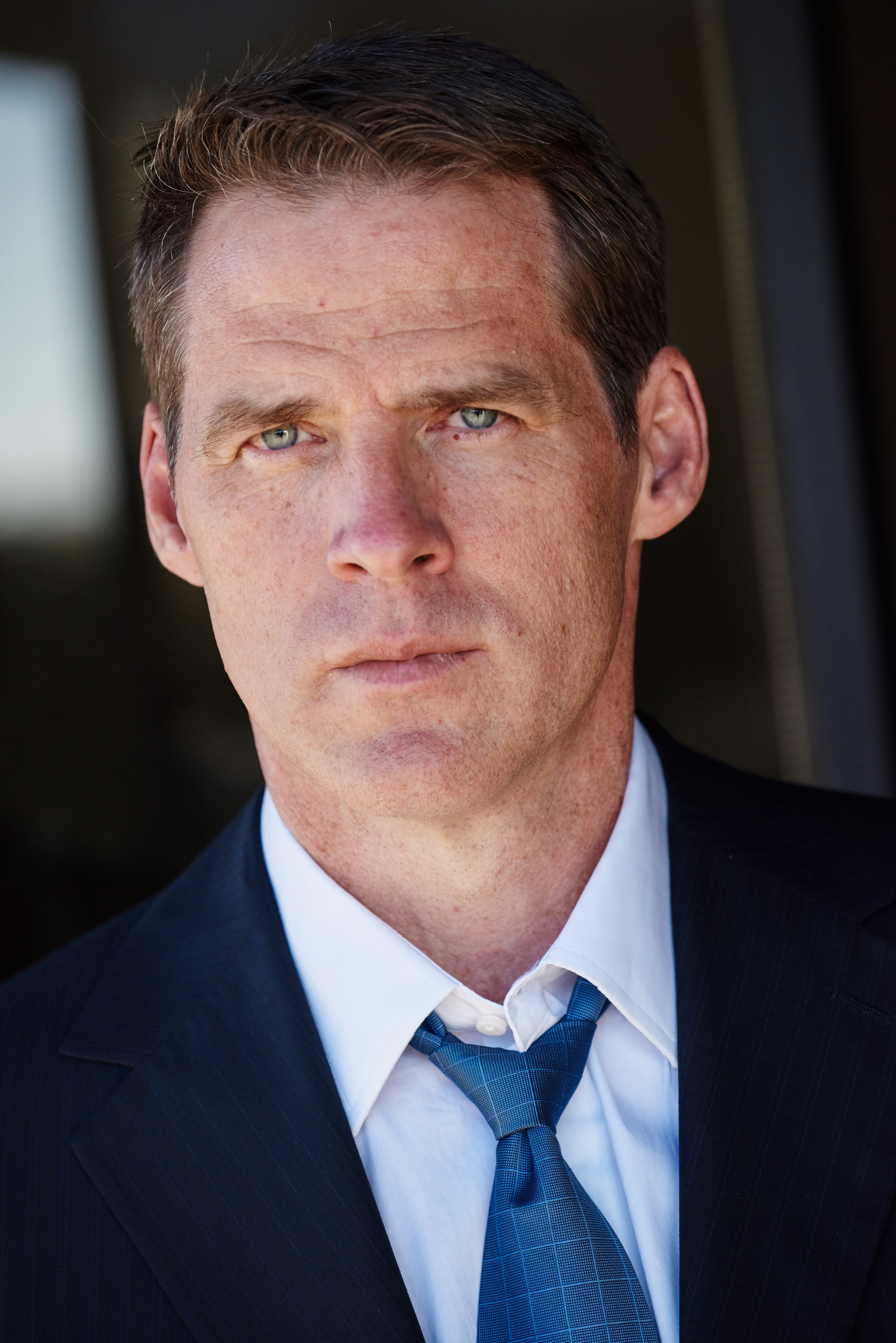
Ben Browder

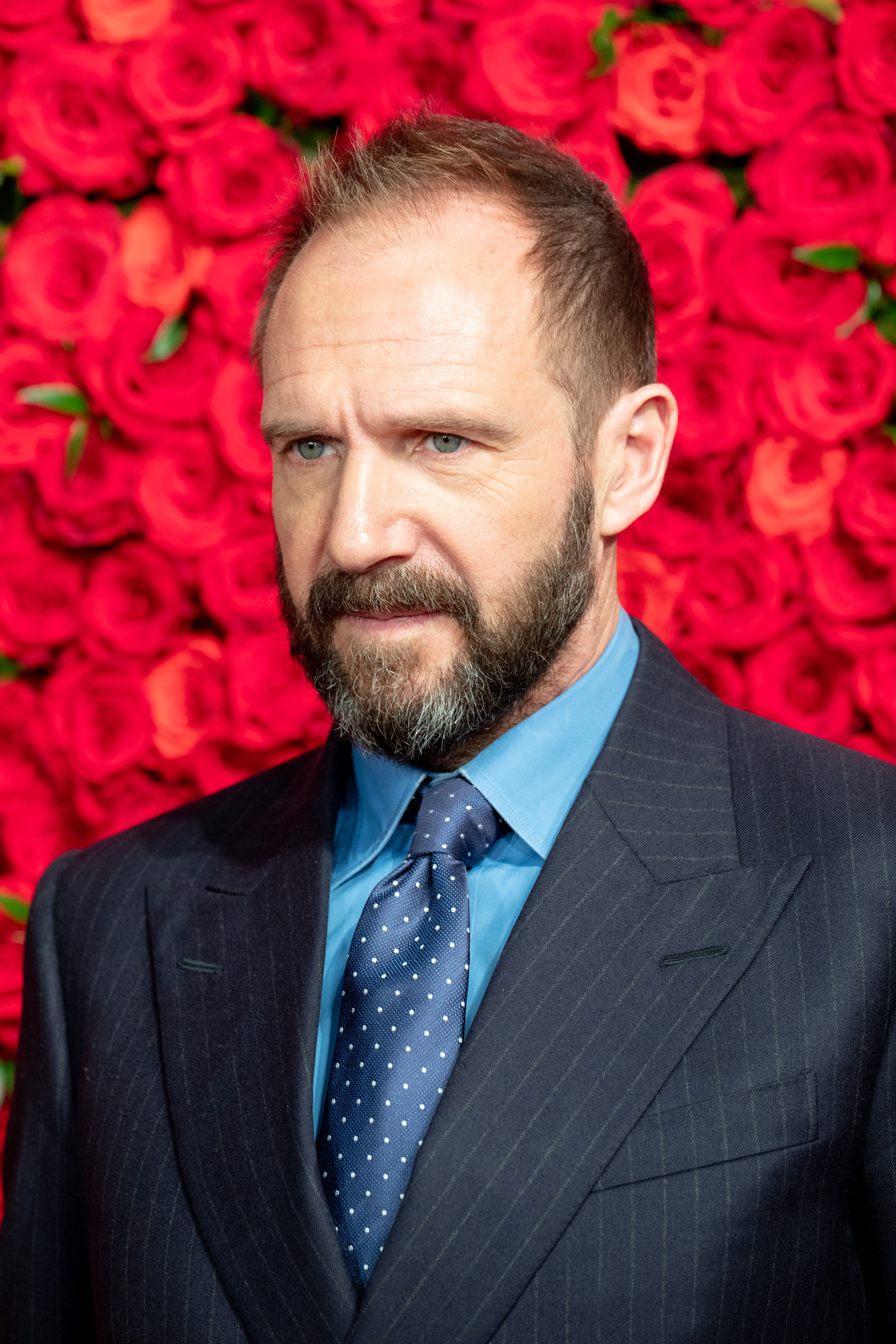
Ralph Fiennes

- December 1
  - Sylvie Daigle, Canadian speed skater
  - Hayashiya Shōzō IX, Japanese rakugoka, tarento and voice actor
- December 3 – Tammy Jackson, American basketball player
- December 5 – José Cura, Argentine tenor
- December 6 – Janine Turner, American actress
- December 9
  - Albert Grajales, INTERPOL Director of Puerto Rico and martial artist
  - Felicity Huffman, American actress
- December 10] –Rakhat Aliyev, Kazakh politician and businessman (d. 2015)
- December 11
  - Ben Browder, American actor
  - Denise Biellmann, Swiss figure skater
- December 12
  - Tracy Austin, American tennis player
  - Arturo Barrios, Mexican long-distance runner
  - Max Raabe, German singer
- December 14 – Yvonne Ryding, Swedish pageant winner (Miss Universe 1984)
- December 16 – Maruschka Detmers, Dutch actress
- December 17
  - Paul Dobson, English footballer
  - Richard Jewell, American security guard and media figure (d. 2007)
  - Galina Malchugina, Russian athlete
- December 18 – James Sie, American actor and voice actor
- December 21 – Steven Mnuchin, 77th United States Secretary of the Treasury
- December 22
  - Andrés Cantor, Argentine/American sportscaster
  - Ralph Fiennes, English actor
- December 23 – Keiji Mutoh, Japanese professional wrestler
- December 24 – Kate Spade, American fashion designer (d. 2018)
- December 25
  - Maryna Bazhanova, Russian handball player (d. 2020)
  - Tony Currie, Australian rugby league player
- December 27
  - Sherri Steinhauer, American golfer
  - Joe Mantello, American actor and director
- December 28
  - Michelle Cameron, Canadian synchronised swimmer
  - Choi Soo-jong, South Korean actor
  - Michel Petrucciani, French jazz pianist and composer (d. 1999)
- December 29 – Carles Puigdemont, Spanish politician
- December 30 – Alessandra Mussolini, Italian politician
- December 31 – Pedro Cardoso, Brazilian actor, screenwriter, playwright and television director

=== Unknown date ===
- Olga Ramos, Venezuelan activist, professor and researcher (d. 2022).

== Deaths ==
=== January ===
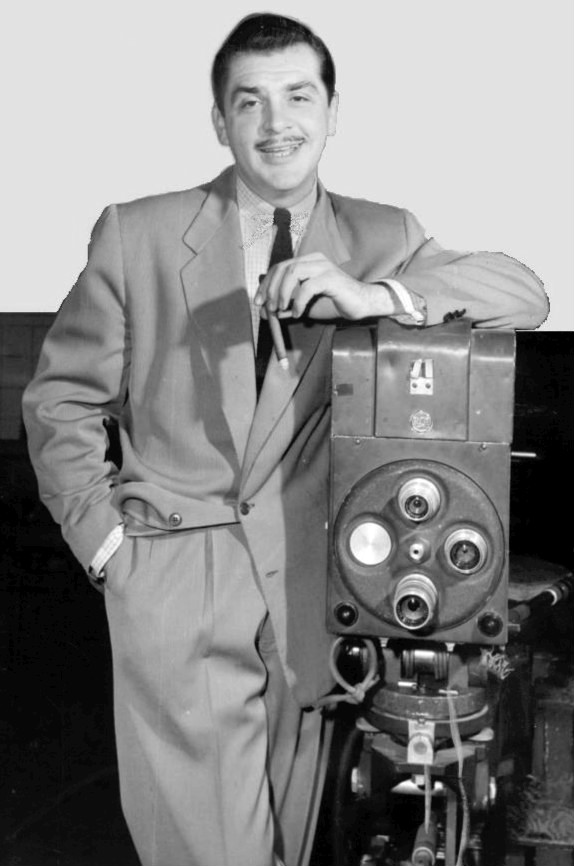
Ernie Kovacs

- January 1 – Diego Martínez Barrio, Spanish politician, 2-time Prime Minister of Spain (b. 1883)
- January 4 – Hans Lammers, German Nazi minister (b. 1879)
- January 13 – Ernie Kovacs, American TV comedian (b. 1919)
- January 16
  - Ivan Meštrović, Croatian-born American sculptor and architect (b. 1883)
  - R. H. Tawney, English historian and social critic (b. 1880)
- January 19 – Snub Pollard, American actor (b. 1889)
- January 20 – Robinson Jeffers, American poet (b. 1887)
- January 21 – Arturo Bragaglia, Italian actor (b. 1893)
- January 26 – Lucky Luciano, American gangster (b. 1897)
- January 29 – Fritz Kreisler, Austrian violinist (b. 1875)

=== February ===
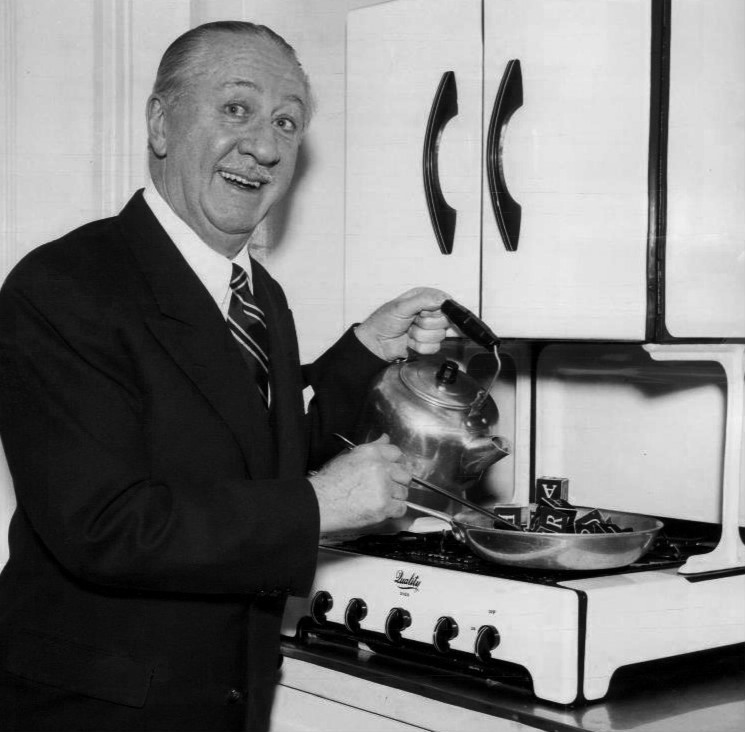
Roy Atwell

Hu Shih

- February 1 – Carey Wilson, American screenwriter (b. 1889)
- February 2 – Shlomo Hestrin, Canadian-born Israeli biochemist (b. 1914)
- February 4 – Daniel Halévy, French historian (b. 1872)
- February 5
  - Jacques Ibert, French composer (b. 1890)
  - James B. Leonardo, American politician (b. 1889)
- February 6
  - Roy Atwell, American actor, comedian and composer (b. 1878)
  - Hussein Khalidi, Jordanian statesman, 29th Prime Minister of Jordan (b. 1895)
  - Cândido Portinari, Brazilian painter (b. 1903)
- February 10 – Eduard von Steiger, Swiss politician, 51st President of the Swiss Confederation (b. 1881)
- February 11 – Indalecio Prieto, Spanish Socialist politician (b. 1891)
- February 13 – Hugh Dalton, British Labour politician (b. 1887)
- February 17
  - Joseph Kearns, American actor (b. 1907)
  - Bruno Walter, German conductor (b. 1876)
- February 19
  - James Barton, American actor (b. 1890)
  - Georgios Papanikolaou, Greek inventor (b. 1883)
- February 20 – Halliwell Hobbes, English-born film actor (b. 1877)
- February 24 – Hu Shih, Chinese philosopher (b. 1891)
- February 25 – Antonina De Angelis, Italian Roman Catholic professed sister and blessed (b. 1880)
- February 27 – Willie Best, American actor (b. 1916)
- February 28 – Chic Johnson, American actor (b. 1891)

=== March ===
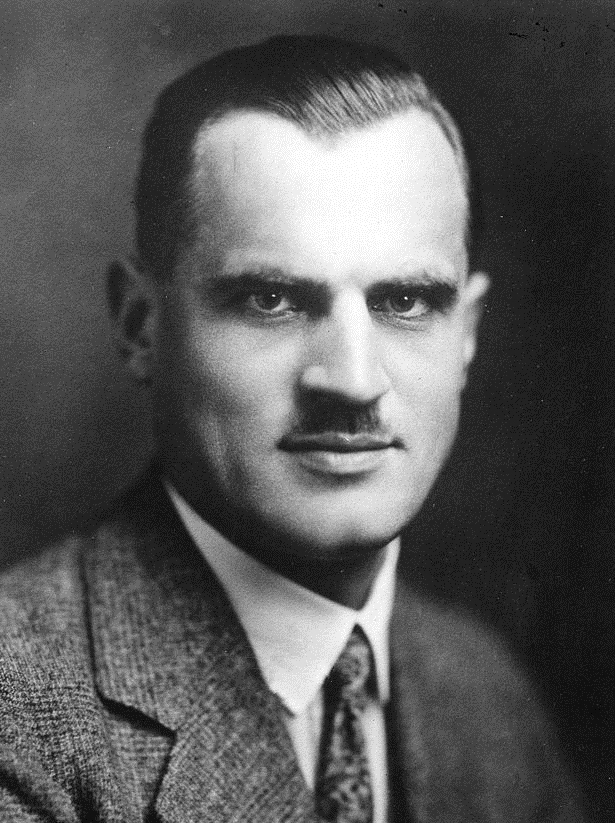
Arthur Compton

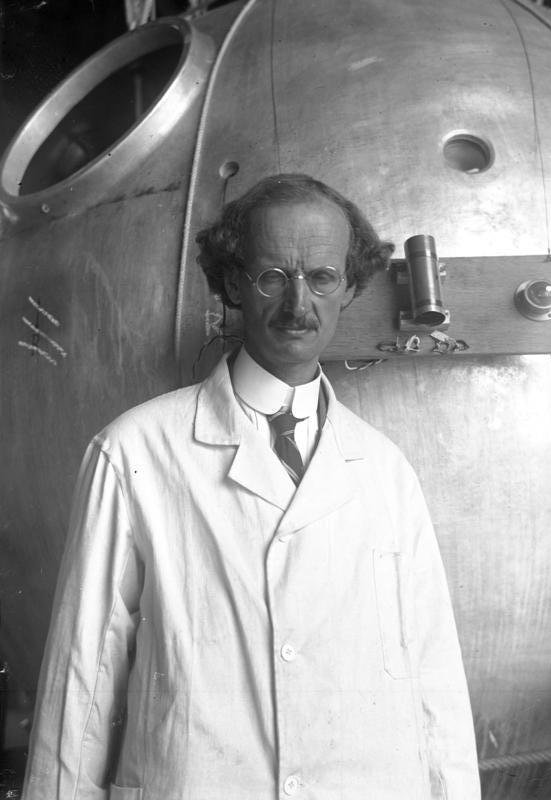
Auguste Piccard

- March 1
  - Roscoe Ates, American actor (b. 1895)
  - Richard L. Conolly, American admiral (b. 1892)
  - W. Alton Jones, American industrialist and philanthropist (b. 1891)
  - Emelyn Whiton, American Olympic sailor (b. 1916)
- March 2 – Walt Kiesling, American football player (Chicago Cardinals) and a member of the Pro Football Hall of Fame (b. 1903)
- March 3 – Pierre Benoit, French novelist (b. 1886)
- March 5 – Nell W. Walker, American politician from West Virginia (b. 1888)
- March 14 – Giovanna Berneri, Italian educationalist and anarchist (b. 1897)
- March 15 – Arthur Compton, American physicist, Nobel Prize laureate (b. 1892)
- March 19 – Vasily Stalin, Soviet general and son of Joseph Stalin (b. 1921)
- March 20
  - C. Wright Mills, American sociologist (b. 1916)
  - A. E. Douglass, American astronomer and founder of dendrochronology (b. 1867)
- March 23 – Josef van Schaik, Dutch politician (b. 1882)
- March 24
  - Jean Goldkette, Greek-born jazz musician (b. 1893)
  - Auguste Piccard, Swiss physicist, aeronaut and explorer (b. 1884)
- March 27 – Augusta Savage, American sculptor (b. 1892)

=== April ===
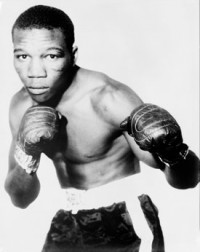
Benny Paret

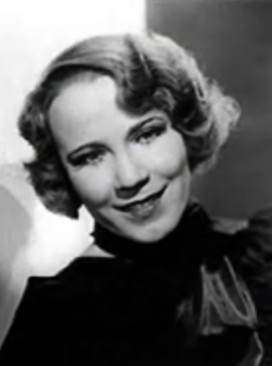
Louise Fazenda

- April 3 – Benny Paret, Cuban welterweight boxer, died as result of injuries in the ring; b. 1937)
- April 4 – James Hanratty, English murderer, one of the last people to be hanged in the U.K. (b. 1936)
- April 5 – Käte Selbmann, German politician (b. 1906)
- April 8 – Juan Belmonte, Spanish bullfighter (b. 1892)
- April 10
  - Michael Curtiz, Austrian-born film director (b. 1886)
  - Manton S. Eddy, American general (b. 1892)
  - Stuart Sutcliffe, British Painter and Musician, original bassist of The Beatles (b. 1940)
- April 14 – M. Visvesvaraya, Indian engineer and politician (b. 1861)
- April 15
  - Clara Blandick, American actress (b. 1876)
  - Arsenio Lacson, Filipino politician and sportswriter (b. 1911)
- April 17 – Louise Fazenda, American actress (b. 1895)
- April 20 – Grover Whalen, American politician (b. 1886)
- April 21 – Sir Frederick Handley Page, English aircraft manufacturer (b. 1885)
- April 22 – Vera Reynolds, American actress (b. 1899)
- April 27 – Josefa Toledo de Aguerri, Nicaraguan pioneer educator (b. 1866)
- April 28 – Gianna Beretta Molla, Italian Roman Catholic pediatrician and saint (b. 1922)
- April 29 – Hajime Tanabe, Japanese philosopher (b. 1885)

=== May ===
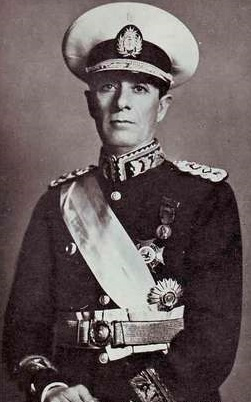
Pedro Pablo Ramírez

- May 3 – Helen Dortch Longstreet, American social advocate, librarian and newspaper publisher (b. 1863)
- May 5 – Ernest Tyldesley, English cricketer (b. 1889)
- May 10 – Shunroku Hata, Marshal of the Imperial Japanese Army (b. 1879)
- May 12 – Pedro Pablo Ramírez, Argentine military general, 26th President of Argentina, leader of the World War II (b. 1884)
- May 13
  - H. Trendley Dean, American dental researcher (b. 1893)
  - Franz Kline, American painter (b. 1910)
- May 19 – Gabriele Münter, German painter (b. 1877)
- May 23 – Rubén Jaramillo, peasant leader, assassinated by the Mexican Army (b. 1900)
- May 26 – Wilfrid Wilson Gibson, English poet (b. 1878)
- May 27 – Egon Petri, German pianist (b. 1881)
- May 31 – Henry F. Ashurst, American politician (b. 1874)

=== June ===
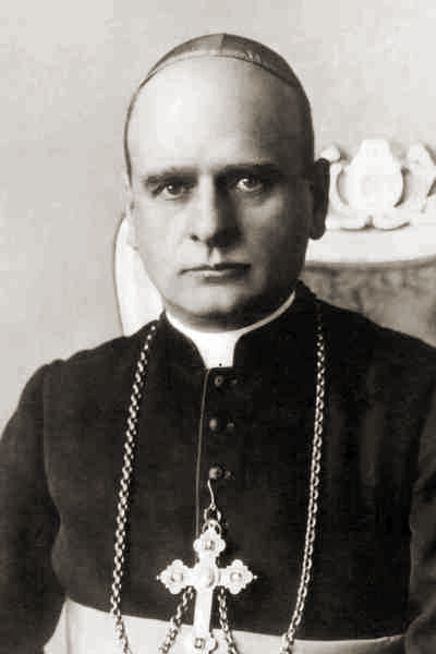
Eugeniusz Baziak

- June 1 – Adolf Eichmann, German SS officer and a major organiser of the Holocaust (executed) (b. 1906)
- June 2 – Vita Sackville-West, English writer and landscape gardener (b. 1892)
- June 4 – William Beebe, American naturalist, ornithologist, marine biologist and entomologist (b. 1877)
- June 6
  - Abba Ahimeir, Soviet-born Israeli journalist (b. 1897)
  - Yves Klein, French painter (b. 1928)
  - Guinn Williams, American actor (b. 1899)
  - Joe Profaci, Italian-American mobster (b. 1897)
- June 7 – Korneli Kekelidze, Georgian philologist (b. 1879)
- June 8 – Eugène Freyssinet, French civil engineer (b. 1879)
- June 9 – Polly Adler, Russian-born American author and madam (b. 1900)
- June 12 – John Ireland, English composer (b. 1879)
- June 13 – Sir Eugene Goossens, English composer (b. 1893)
- June 15
  - Eugeniusz Baziak, Polish Roman Catholic archbishop (b. 1890)
  - Alfred Cortot, Swiss pianist and conductor (b. 1877)
- June 16 – Aleksei Antonov, General of the Soviet Army (b. 1896)
- June 19
  - Frank Borzage, American film director (b. 1894)
  - Will Wright, American character actor (b. 1891)
- June 24 – Lucile Watson, Canadian actress (b. 1879)
- June 25 – Sir Raymond Leane, Australian army general (b. 1878)
- June 27 – Paul Viiding, Estonian poet, author and literary critic (b. 1904)
- June 28 – Mickey Cochrane, American baseball player (b. 1903)
- June 29 – Charles Lyon Chandler, American historian (b. 1883)

=== July ===
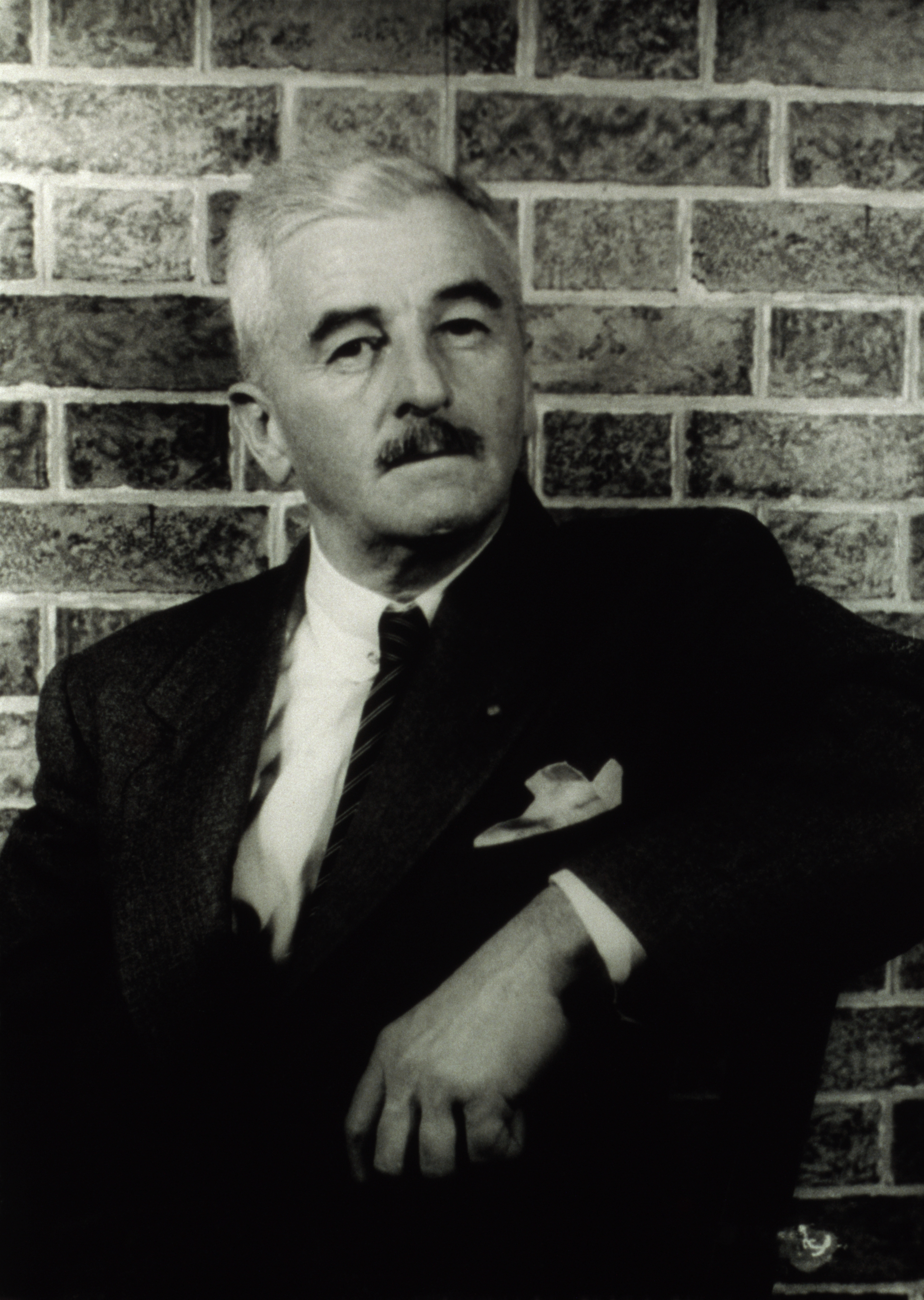
William Faulkner

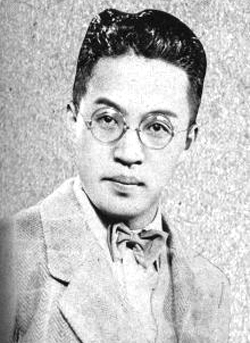
Denjirō Ōkōchi

- July 1 – Bidhan Chandra Roy, Indian physician and politician, Chief Minister of West Bengal (b. 1882)
- July 2
  - Arconovaldo Bonaccorsi, Italian soldier (b. 1898)
  - Valeska Suratt, American stage actress, silent film star (b. 1882)
- July 4 – Rex Bell, American actor and politician (b. 1903)
- July 6
  - John Anderson, British-born Australian philosopher (b. 1893)
  - Sir Paul Boffa, Maltese politician, 5th Prime Minister of Malta (b. 1890)
  - William Faulkner, American writer, Nobel Prize laureate (b. 1897)
  - Archduke Joseph August of Austria, Austrian field marshal and former regent of Hungary (b. 1872)
- July 8 – Georges Bataille, French writer and philosopher (b. 1897)
- July 10 – Yehuda Leib Maimon, Bassarabian-born Israeli rabbi and government minister (b. 1875)
- July 11 – Owen D. Young, American industrialist, businessman, lawyer and diplomat (b. 1874)
- July 12 – Roger Wolfe Kahn, American bandleader (b. 1907)
- July 13 – Jerry Wald, American screenwriter and producer (b. 1911)
- July 18 – Denjirō Ōkōchi, Japanese actor (b. 1898)
- July 21 – G. M. Trevelyan, English historian (b. 1876)
- July 23 – Victor Moore, American actor (b. 1876)
- July 26
  - Raquel Meller, Spanish singer and actress (b. 1888)
  - George Preca, Maltese Roman Catholic priest and saint (b. 1880)
- July 27 – Richard Aldington, English poet (b. 1892)
- July 29
  - Leonardo De Lorenzo, Italian flautist (b. 1875)
  - Sir Ronald Fisher, English-born statistician and geneticist (b. 1890)
- July 30 – Myron McCormick, American actor (b. 1908)

=== August ===
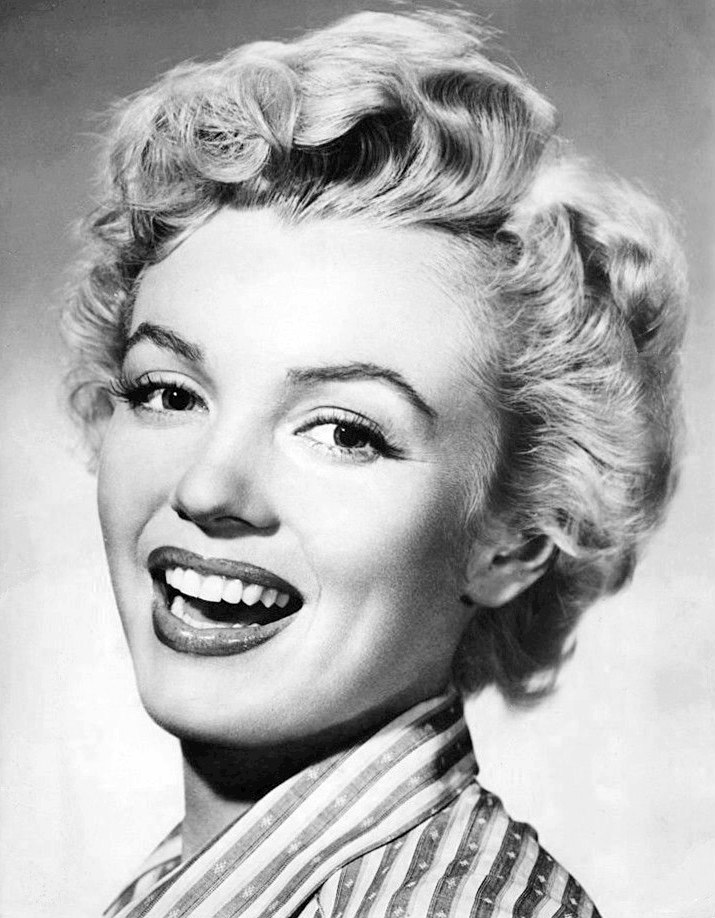
Marilyn Monroe

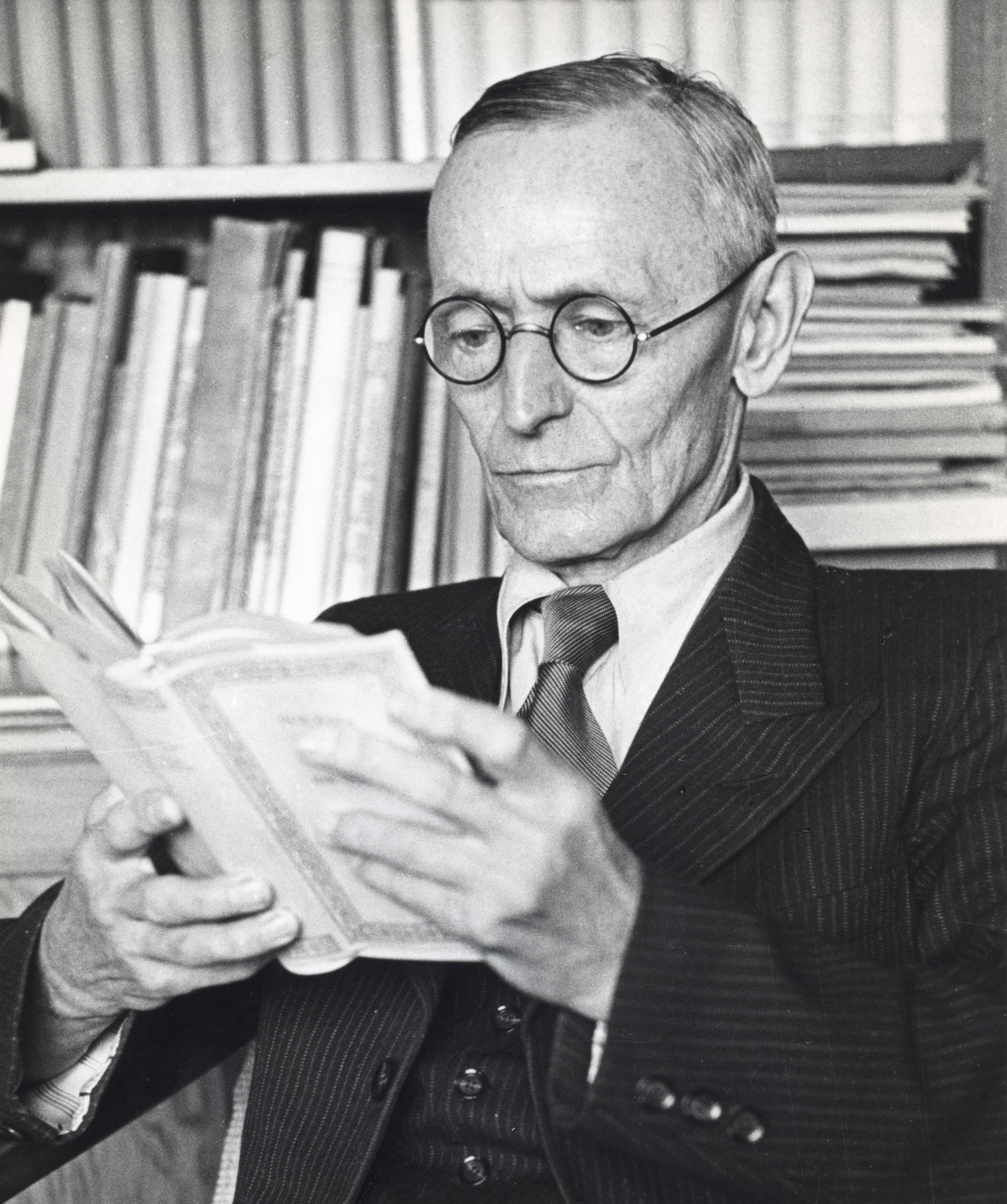
Hermann Hesse

- August 4 – Marilyn Monroe, American actress (b. 1926)
- August 5 – Ramón Pérez de Ayala, Spanish writer and diplomat (b. 1880)
- August 6
  - Ángel Borlenghi, Argentine labor leader and politician (b. 1904)
  - Emmi Mäkelin, Finnish midwife and politician (b. 1874)
- August 9 – Hermann Hesse, German-born writer, Nobel Prize laureate (b. 1877)
- August 15 – Lei Feng, Chinese soldier (b. 1940)
- August 18 – Cleo Ridgely, American actress (b. 1893)
- August 19 – Jean Lucienbonnet, French racing driver (b. 1923)
- August 21 – Ahmad Ibrahim, Malaysian-born Singaporean politician (b. 1927)
- August 22 – Charles Rigoulot, French Olympic weightlifter (b. 1903)
- August 23
  - Hoot Gibson, American actor and film director (b. 1892)
  - Joseph Berchtold, Nazi officer, Second commander of the SS (b. 1897)
- August 24 – Mykolas Biržiška, Lithuanian politician (b. 1882)
- August 26 – Dušan Simović, Yugoslav general, 18th Prime Minister of Yugoslavia (b. 1882)
- August 27 – Leopoldo Panero, Spanish poet (b. 1909)
- August 28 – John Collum, American actor (b. 1926)
- August 29 – Georgina de Albuquerque, Brazilian painter (b. 1885)
- August 31 – Felicjan Sławoj Składkowski, Prime Minister of Poland (b. 1885)

=== September ===
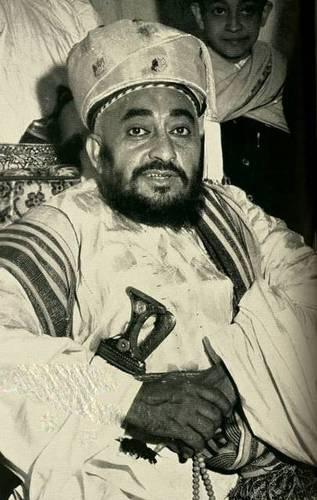
Ahmad bin Yahya

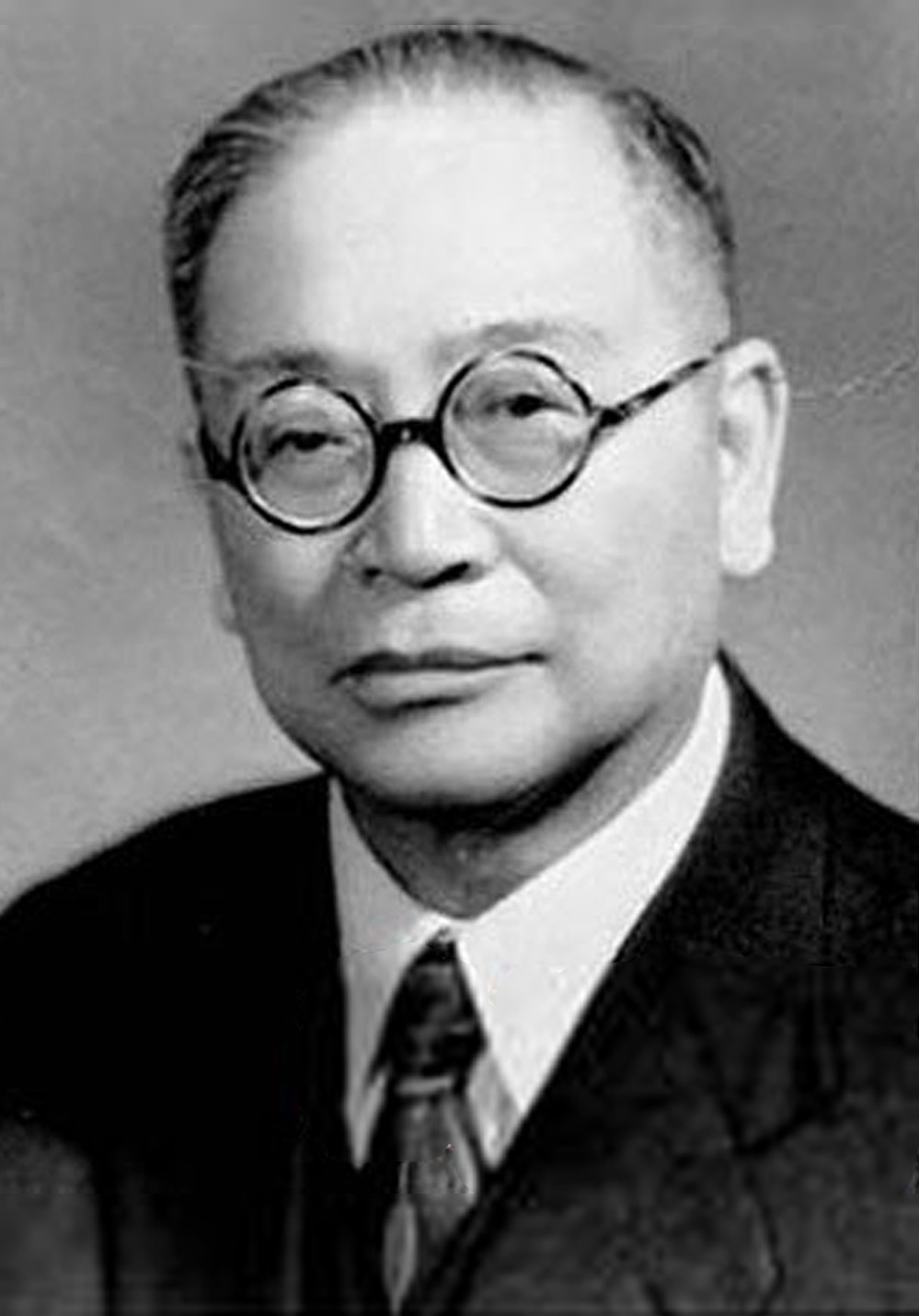
Ouyang Yuqian

- September 1 – Hans-Jürgen von Arnim, German general (b. 1889)
- September 3 – E. E. Cummings, American poet (b. 1894)
- September 4
  - Juan Atilio Bramuglia, Argentine composer (b. 1903)
  - William Clothier, American tennis player (b. 1881)
- September 6 – Hanns Eisler, Austrian composer (b. 1898)
- September 7
  - Karen Blixen, Danish writer (b. 1885)
  - Morris Louis, American painter (b. 1912)
  - Graham Walker, English motorcycle racer (b. 1896)
- September 11 – Kenkichi Ueda, Japanese general (b. 1875)
- September 12 – Wiktor Thommée, Polish general (b. 1881)
- September 17 – Ian Aird, Scottish surgeon (b. 1905)
- September 19
  - Ahmad bin Yahya, King of Yemen (b. 1891)
  - Nikolai Pogodin, Soviet playwright (b. 1900)
- September 20 – Conrad Helfrich, Dutch admiral (b. 1886)
- September 21 – Ouyang Yuqian, Chinese playwright, director and Peking opera performer (b. 1889)
- September 23
  - Louis de Soissons, Canadian-born English architect (b. 1890)
  - Patrick Hamilton, English dramatist (b. 1904)
- September 26 – Francisco de Paula Brochado da Rocha, Prime Minister of Brazil (b. 1910)

=== October ===
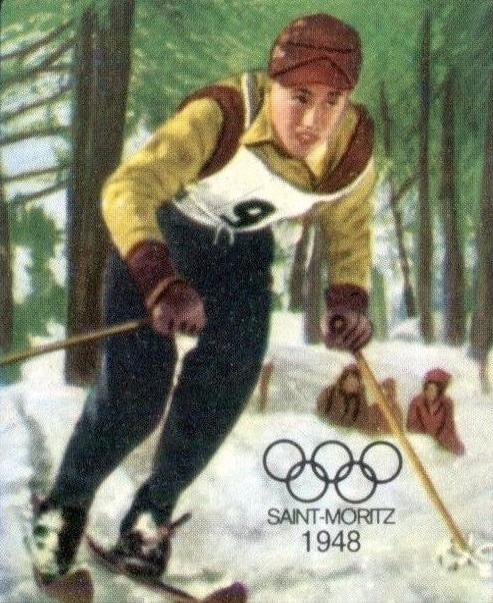
Henri Oreiller

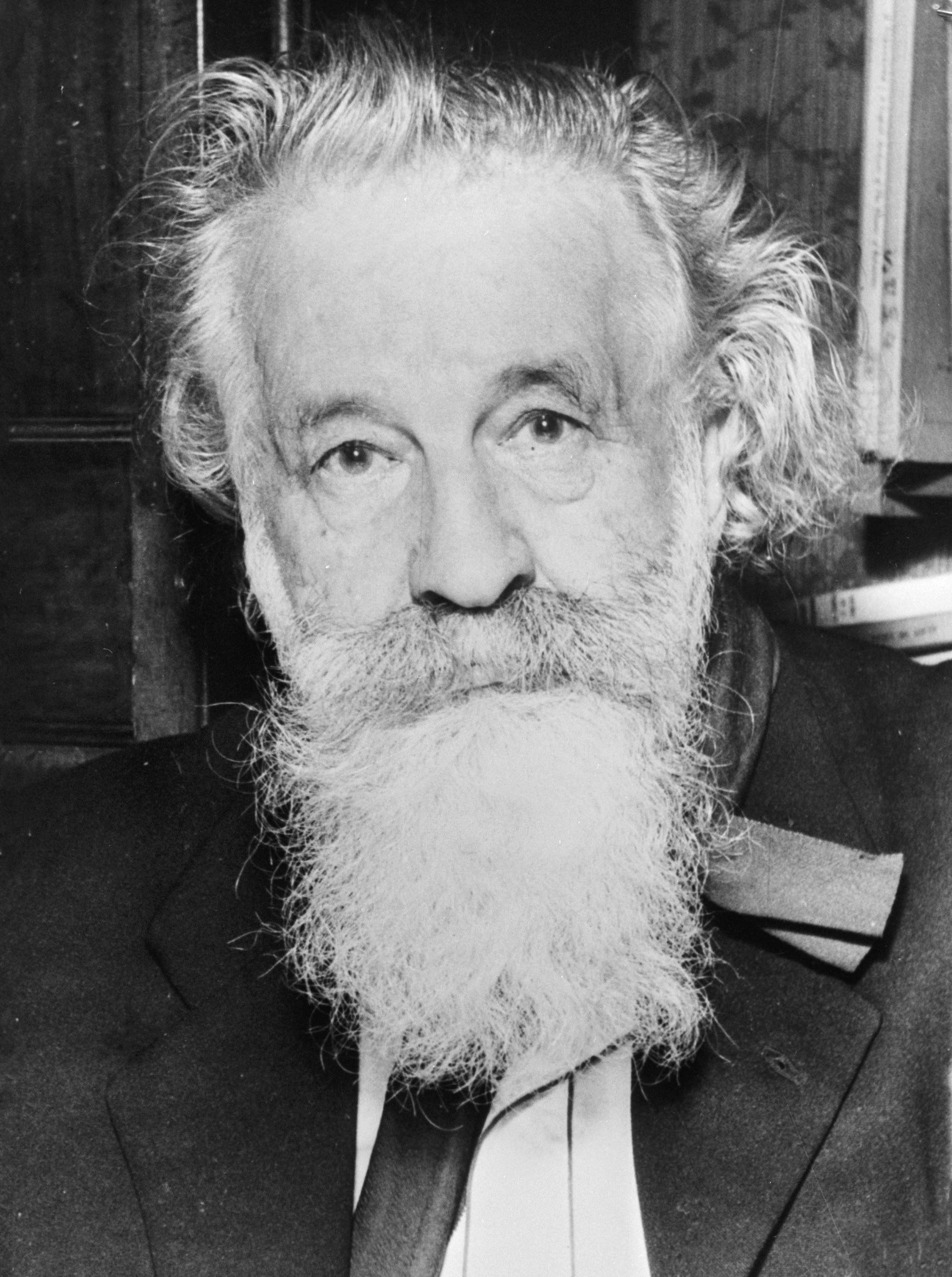
Gaston Bachelard

- October 1 – Ludwig Bemelmans, Austro-Hungarian born American writer (b. 1898)
- October 2
  - Henry Louis Larsen, American Marine Corps general; Governor of American Samoa and Governor of Guam (b. 1890)
  - Frank Lovejoy, American actor (b. 1912)
- October 6 – Tod Browning, American film director (b. 1880)
- October 7 – Henri Oreiller, French Olympic alpine skier (b. 1925)
- October 8 – Solomon Linda, South African singer-songwriter (b. 1909)
- October 9 – Milan Vidmar, Slovenian chess player (b. 1885)
- October 10 – Stancho Belkovski, Bulgarian architect and lecturer (b. 1891)
- October 11 – Erich von Tschermak, Austrian agronomist (b. 1871)
- October 12 – Alberto Teisaire, Argentine Navy officer and Vice President of the Republic (assassinated) (b. 1891)
- October 14 – Irma Gramatica, Italian actress (b. 1870)
- October 16
  - Gaston Bachelard, French philosopher (b. 1884)
  - Princess Helen of Serbia (b.1884)
- October 17 – Natalia Goncharova, Russian artist (b. 1881)
- October 20 – Jesús Herrera, Spanish international footballer (b. 1938)
- October 26 – Louise Beavers, American actress (b. 1900)
- October 27
  - Otto Froitzheim, German tennis player (b. 1884)
  - Enrico Mattei, Italian politician (plane crash) (b. 1906)
- October 31 – Louis Massignon, French Catholic scholar of Islam (b. 1883)

=== November ===
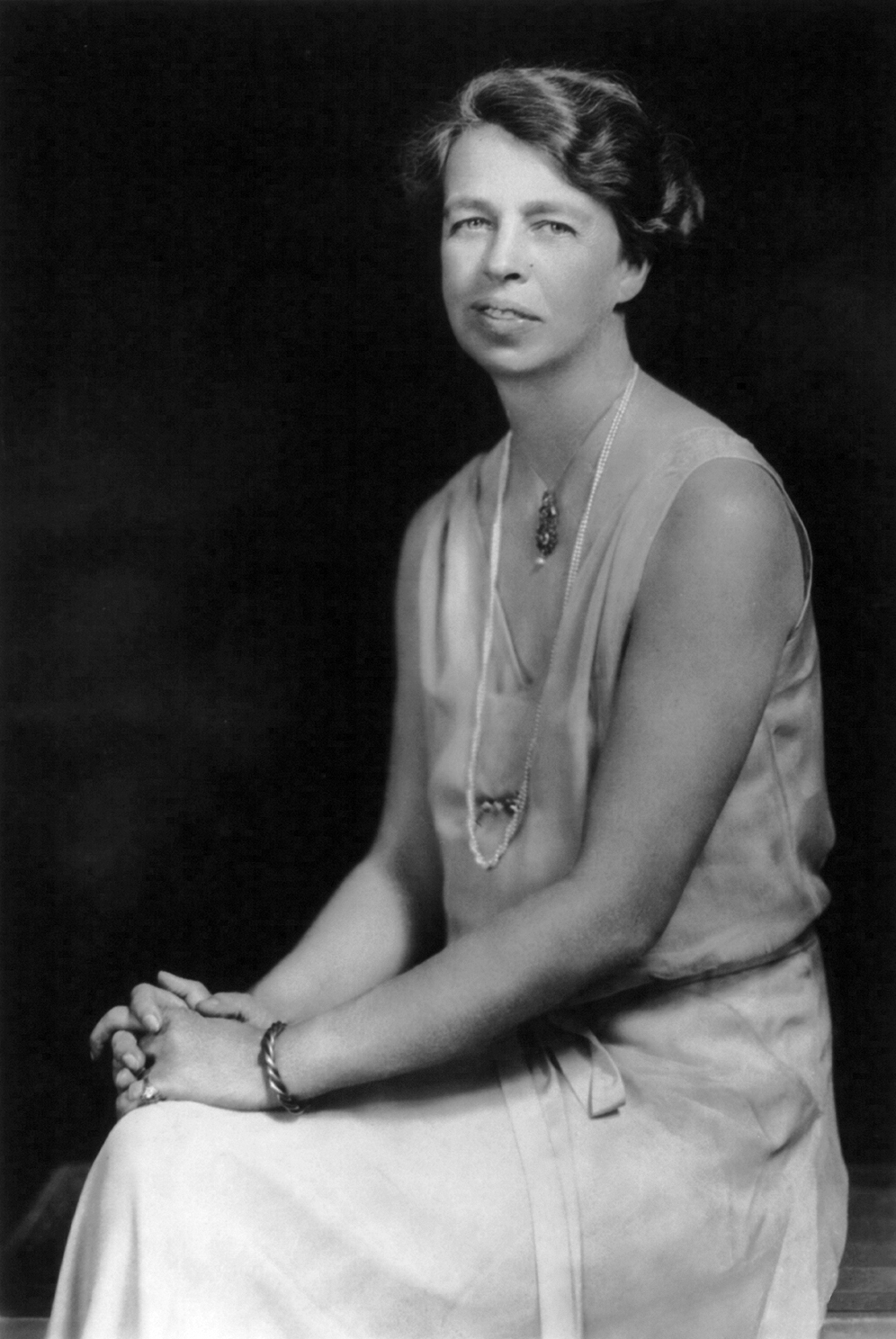
Eleanor Roosevelt

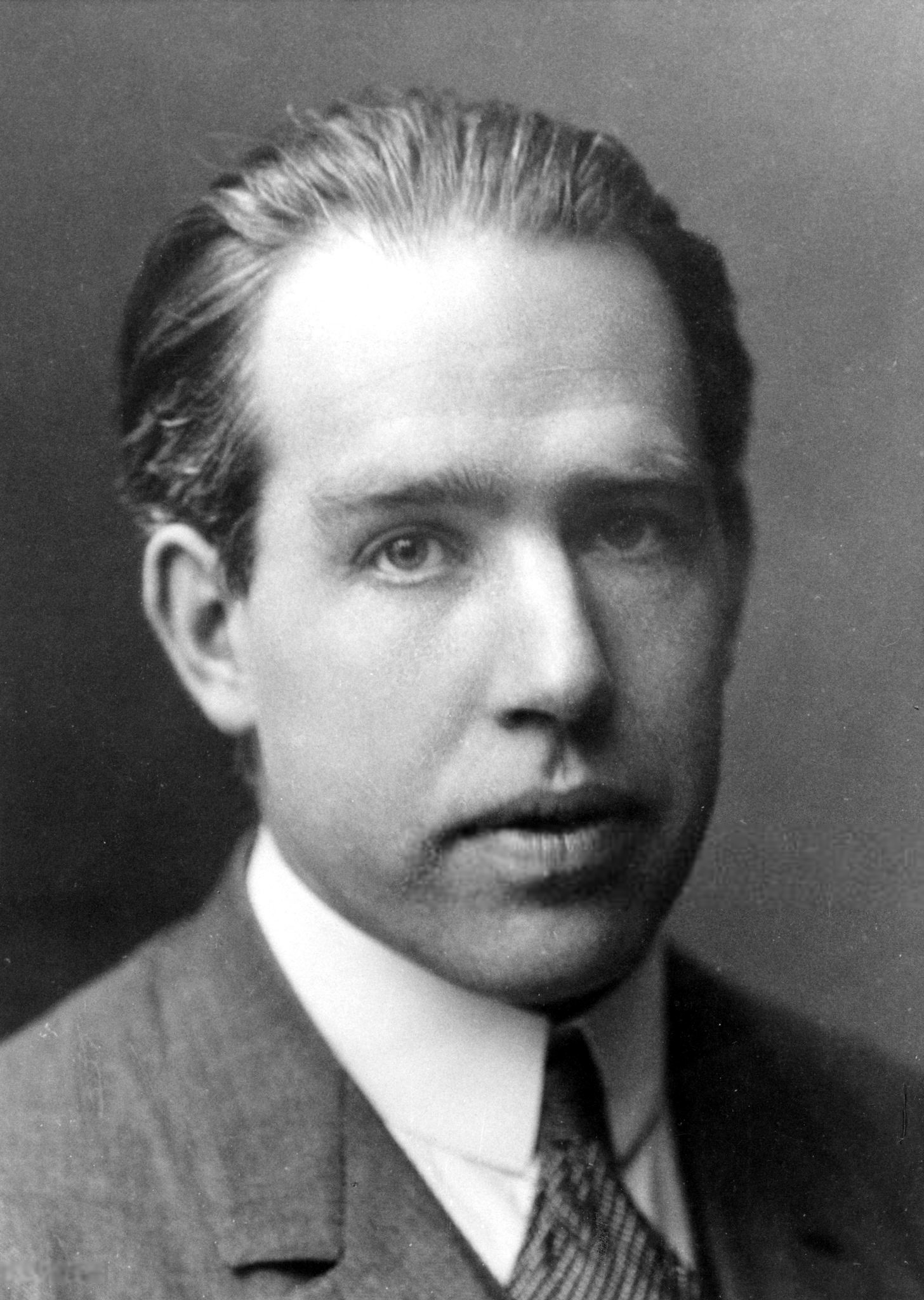
Niels Bohr

- November 7 – Eleanor Roosevelt, American politician, diplomat and activist, First Lady of the United States (b. 1884)
- November 8 – Willis H. O'Brien, American stop motion animator (b. 1886)
- November 14
  - Alwi bin Thahir al-Haddad, Yemeni-born Malaysian Islamic scholar (b. 1884)
  - Manuel Gálvez, Argentine writer and historian (b. 1882)
- November 15 – Irene (costume designer), American costume designer (b. 1901)
- November 18
  - Domingo Arrieta León, Mexican general and statesman (b. 1874)
  - Niels Bohr, Danish physicist, Nobel Prize laureate (b. 1885)
- November 19 – Francisco Tudela y Varela, 68th Prime Minister of Peru (b. 1876)
- November 21 – Frank Amyot, Canadian canoeist (b. 1904)
- November 22 – René Coty, 17th President of France (b. 1882)
- November 23 – Grace Butler, New Zealand artist (b. 1886)
- November 25 – Forrest Smithson, American Olympic athlete (b. 1884)
- November 26
  - Aleksandr Antonov, Soviet actor (b. 1898)
  - Albert Sarraut, 2-time prime minister of France (b. 1872)
- November 28
  - K. C. Dey, Indian singer, composer, actor and teacher (b. 1893)
  - Queen Wilhelmina of the Netherlands (b. 1880)
- November 29 – Erik Scavenius, 12th Prime Minister of Denmark (b. 1877)
- November 30 – Joseph Lade Pawsey, Australian radio astronomer (b. 1908)

=== December ===
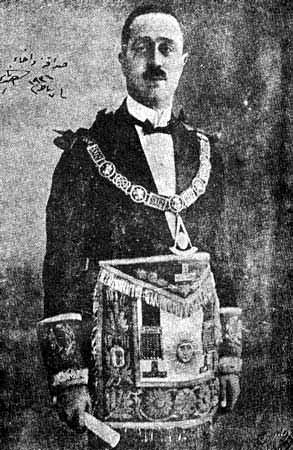
Ahmad Nami

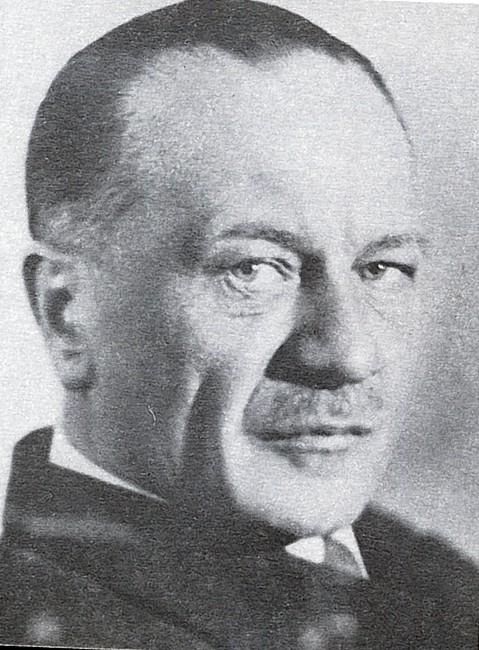
Kazimierz Świtalski

- December 6 – Harry Bauler, American politician (b. 1910)
- December 7 – Kirsten Flagstad, Norwegian soprano (b. 1895)
- December 13
  - Sir John Cunningham, British admiral (b. 1885)
  - Ahmad Nami, Prince of the Ottoman Empire, 5th Prime Minister of Syria and 2nd President of Syria (b. 1879)
- December 14 – Alfredo Kindelán, Spanish general and politician (b. 1879)
- December 15 – Charles Laughton, English actor and director (b. 1899)
- December 17 – Thomas Mitchell, American actor (b. 1892)
- December 18 – Garrett Mattingly, American historian (b. 1900)
- December 20 – Emil Artin, Austrian mathematician (b. 1898)
- December 21 – Gary Hocking, Rhodesian motorcycle racer (b. 1937)
- December 22 – Solon Earl Low, Canadian social credit politician (b. 1900)
- December 23 – José Giral, Spanish politician, former Prime Minister (b. 1879)
- December 24
  - Wilhelm Ackermann, German mathematician (b. 1896)
  - Eveline Adelheid von Maydell, German artist (b. 1890)
- December 26 – Calcedonio Di Pisa, Italian criminal (b. 1931)
- December 28 – Kazimierz Świtalski, Polish diplomat, politician, soldier and military officer, 18th Prime Minister of Poland (b. 1886)
- December 30 – Arthur Lovejoy, American philosopher and historian (b. 1873)

=== Date unknown ===
- Fawzi Al-Mulki, Prime Minister of Jordan (b. 1910)
- Ștefan Balaban, Romanian general (b. 1890)
- Abdallah Beyhum, 10th Prime Minister of Lebanon (b. 1879)
- Petre Cameniță, Romanian general (b. 1889)
- Henry Matthew Talintyre, British comic strip artist (b. 1893)

== Nobel Prizes ==

- Physics – Lev Landau
- Chemistry – Max Perutz, John Kendrew
- Physiology or Medicine – Francis Crick, James Watson, Maurice Wilkins
- Literature – John Steinbeck
- Peace – Linus Pauling
