= Dolcetto =

Variety of grape

- Grape (Vitis)
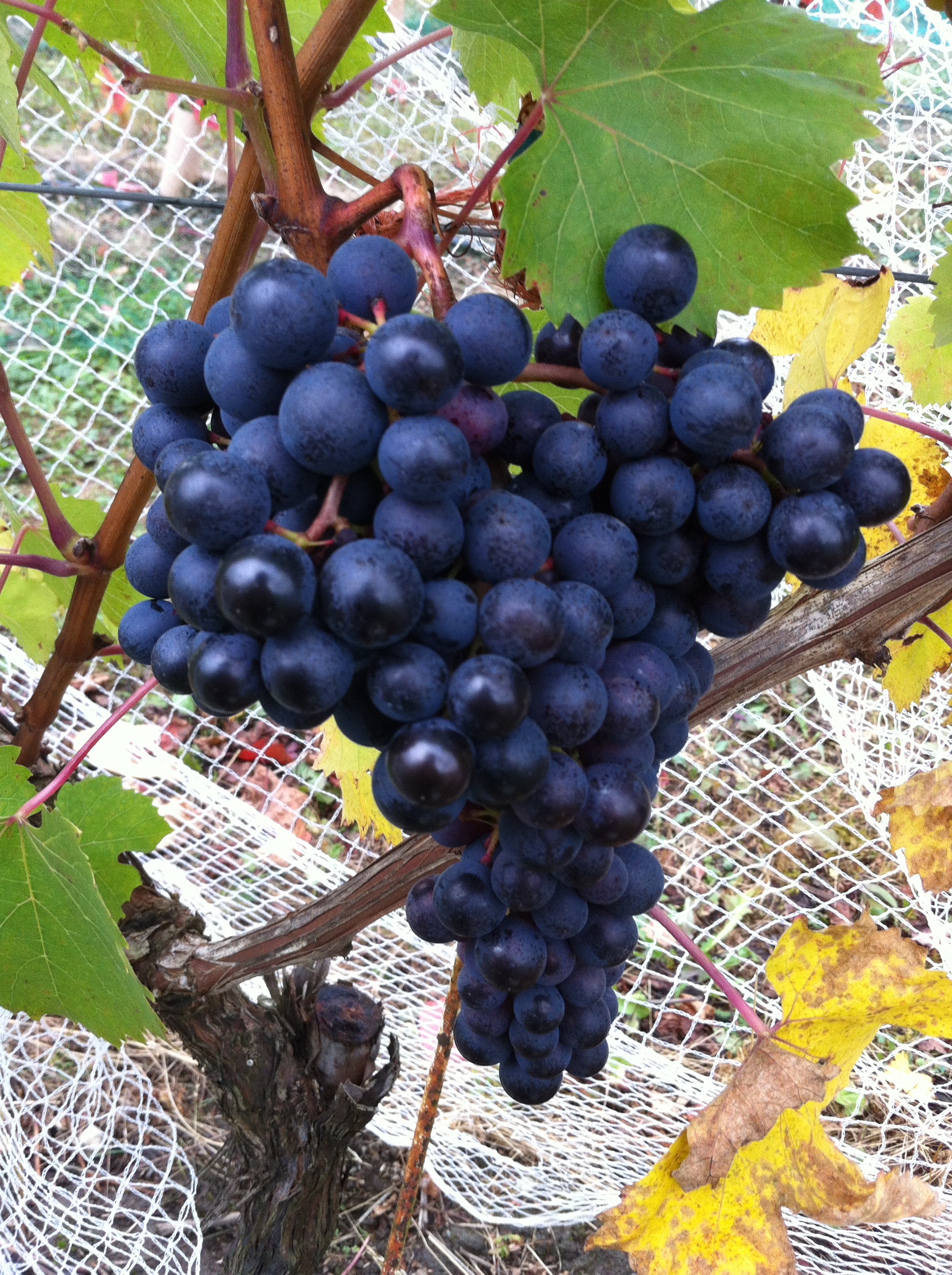
- Dolcetto grapes
- Color of berry skin: Noir
- Species: Vitis vinifera
- Also called: Dolsin, Ormeasco (more)
- Origin: Italy
- Notable regions: Piedmont
- Notable wines: Dolcetto di Dogliani, Dolcetto di Diano d'Alba
- VIVC number: 3626

Dolcetto (UK: /dɒlˈtʃɛtoʊ/ dol-CHET-oh, US: /doʊlˈ-/ dohl-, Italian: [dolˈtʃetto]) is a black Italian wine grape variety widely grown in the Piedmont region of northwest Italy. The Italian word dolcetto means "little sweet one", but it is not certain that the name originally carried any reference to the grape’s sugar levels: it is possible that it derives from the name of the hills where the vine is cultivated. In any case the wines produced are nearly always dry. They can be tannic and fruity with moderate, or decidedly low, levels of acidity and are typically meant to be consumed within a few years after release.

== History ==
One theory suggests the grape originated in France and was brought to Monferrato sometime in the 11th century. A competing theory has the grape originating in the Piedmontese village of Dogliani. In 1593, an ordinance of the municipality of Dogliani which forbade the harvesting of dozzetti grapes earlier than Saint Matthew's Day, unless an exceptional authorization had been granted, has been taken to refer to this variety, which is still known in local dialects under the names duzet and duset. A document of 1633 records the presence of Dolcetto in the cellars of the Arboreo family of Valenza. In 1700, Barnabà Centurione sent the wine as a gift to Queen Anne of Great Britain.

Along with the French grape Chatus, Dolcetto is a parent variety to several Piedmontese grapes including Valentino nero, Passus and San Martino.

== Regions ==
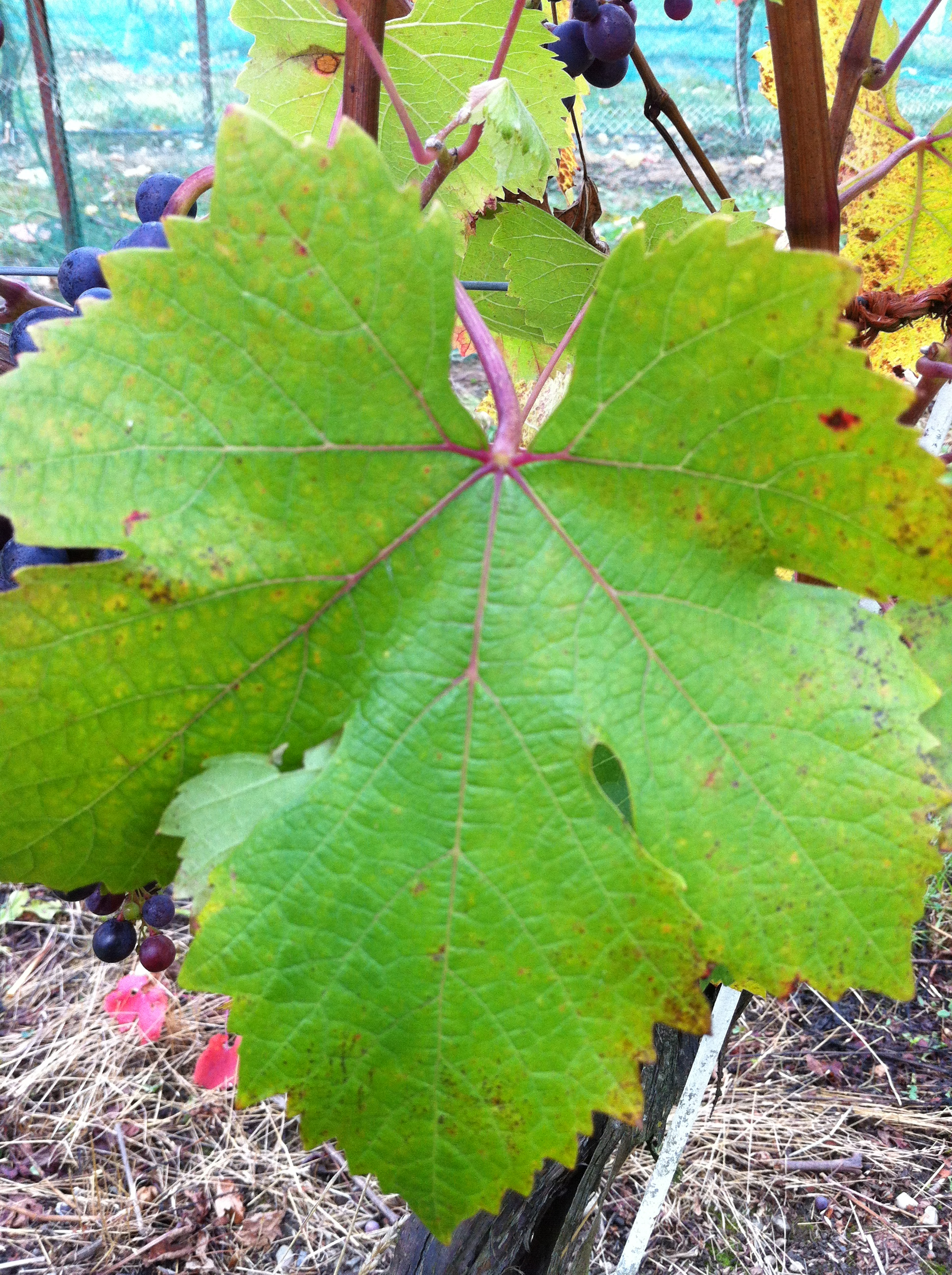
Dolcetto vine leaf

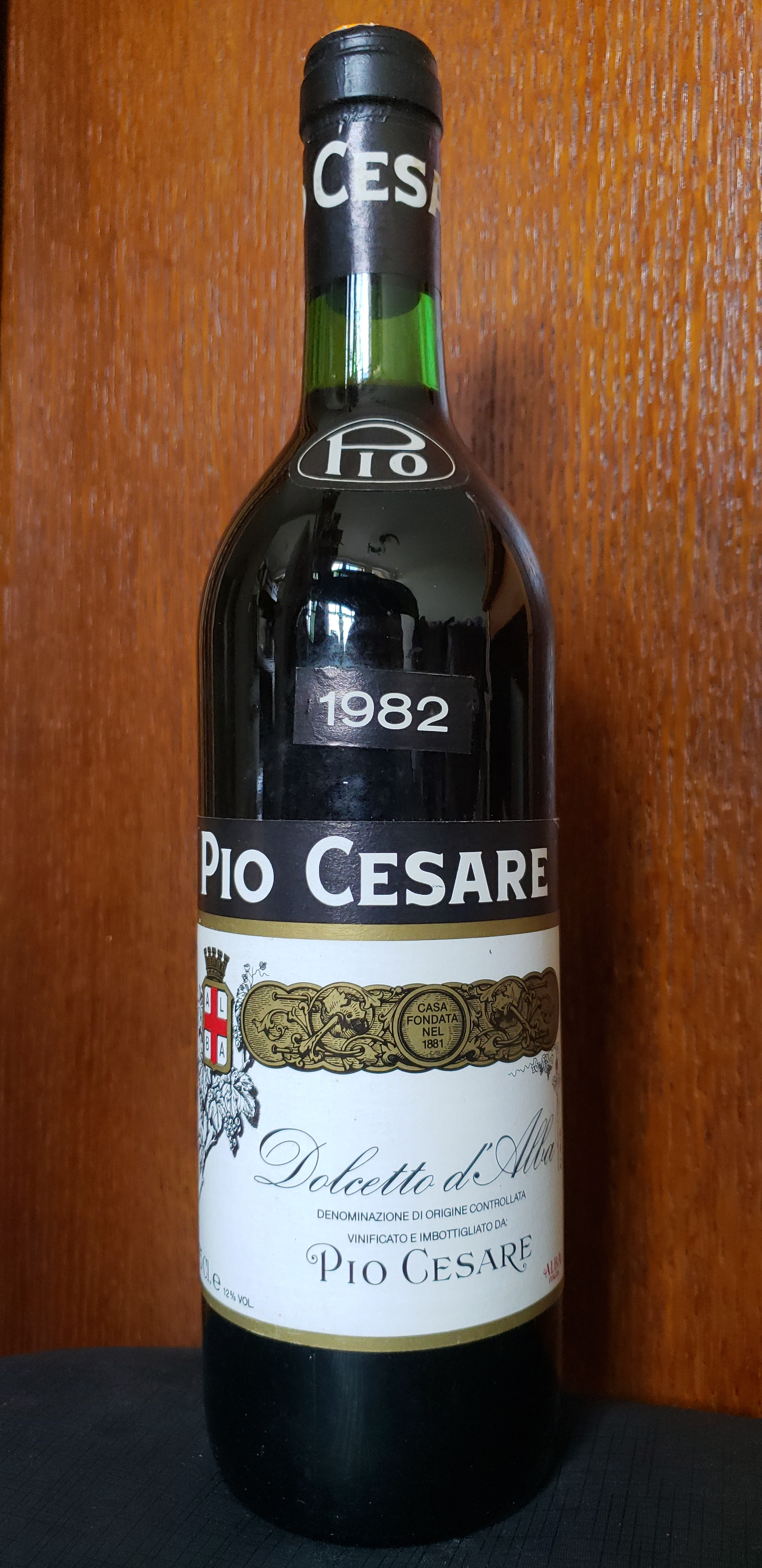
Pio Cesare Dolcetto d'Alba 1982

Most Dolcetto is found in the Piedmont region of northwest Italy, where many of the top estates produce Dolcetto on less-favoured sites as an "early to market wine" to generate some income for the winery while the Nebbiolo and Barbera are being matured. It is particularly associated with the towns of Dogliani and Diano d'Alba in the province of Cuneo, although the greatest volumes come from around Alba and Ovada. The grape is also found in Liguria under the name Ormeasco, and in the Oltrepò Pavese where it is called Nebbiolo or Nibièu.

Of the 100% Dolcetto DOCs, all but one have two levels, the "standard" version typically requiring a minimum 11.5% ABV, and the Superiore at 12.5% ABV. They are Dolcetto di Dogliani (DOCG since 2005), Dolcetto d'Acqui, Dolcetto d'Alba, Dolcetto d'Asti, Dolcetto delle Langhe Monregalesi (integrated to Dogliani DOCG in 2011), Dolcetto di Diano d'Alba and Dolcetto d'Ovada. Only Langhe Dolcetto has no Superiore variety. Of the blended wines, Riviera Ligure di Ponente Ormeasco requires a minimum of 95% Dolcetto/Ormeasco; Colli Tortonesi Dolcetto, Monferrato Dolcetto and Pineronese Dolcetto a minimum of 85%, and Valsusa a minimum of 60%. Golfo Del Tigullio can be between 20-70%, while Lago di Corbara and Rosso Orvietano contain less than 20% Dolcetto.

Outside of Italy, Dolcetto is known as Douce Noire in Savoie and Charbono in California. However, DNA fingerprinting done at the University of California, Davis has shown that the actual Douce Noire and Charbono vines are not, in fact, Dolcetto, but two different vines. In spite of this confirmation, some plantings of true Dolcetto vines still retain the local synonyms in some areas of Savoie and California.

The grape was first brought to California by expatriate Italians, and is most popular in Lodi AVA, Mendocino County, Russian River Valley AVA, Napa Valley AVA, Santa Cruz Mountains AVA, Sta. Rita Hills AVA, and Santa Barbara County. The Dolcetto grape is gaining popularity in the Washington State Lake Chelan AVA (C R Sandidge Wines Purtteman Estate vineyard). There are also some plantings in the Oregon AVAs of Umpqua Valley AVA and Southern Oregon AVA, Michigan's Leelanau Peninsula AVA (Ciccone Vineyard & Winery), as well as the statewide appellations of New Mexico and Pennsylvania. Dolcetto is also being produced in the Texas Hill Country with great results as well.

Australia is home to the oldest current plantings of Dolcetto, with vines dating back to the 1860s.

=== Dogliani DOCG ===
Dogliani, and Dogliani Superiore are Italian red wines produced in the Langhe using only the Dolcetto grape variety. The wines were recognized as DOC in 1974 under the name Dolcetto di Dogliani. In 2005, the original DOC was revoked and gradually replaced by a DOCG named Dogliani. The yield of grapes is restricted to eight metric tons per hectare for Dogliani and seven for Dogliani Superiore. Furthermore, to qualify for Superiore status, the wines must be aged for at least one year. The vineyards are restricted to the hilly areas within the boundaries of the communes of Bastia Mondovì, Belvedere Langhe, Briaglia, Castellino Tanaro, Cigliè, Clavesana, Dogliani, Farigliano, Igliano, Marsaglia, Monchiero, Niella Tanaro, Piozzo and Rocca Cigliè, plus parts of the communes of Carrù, Mondovì, Murazzano, Roddino, San Michele Mondovì, Somano and Vicoforte.

== Wines ==
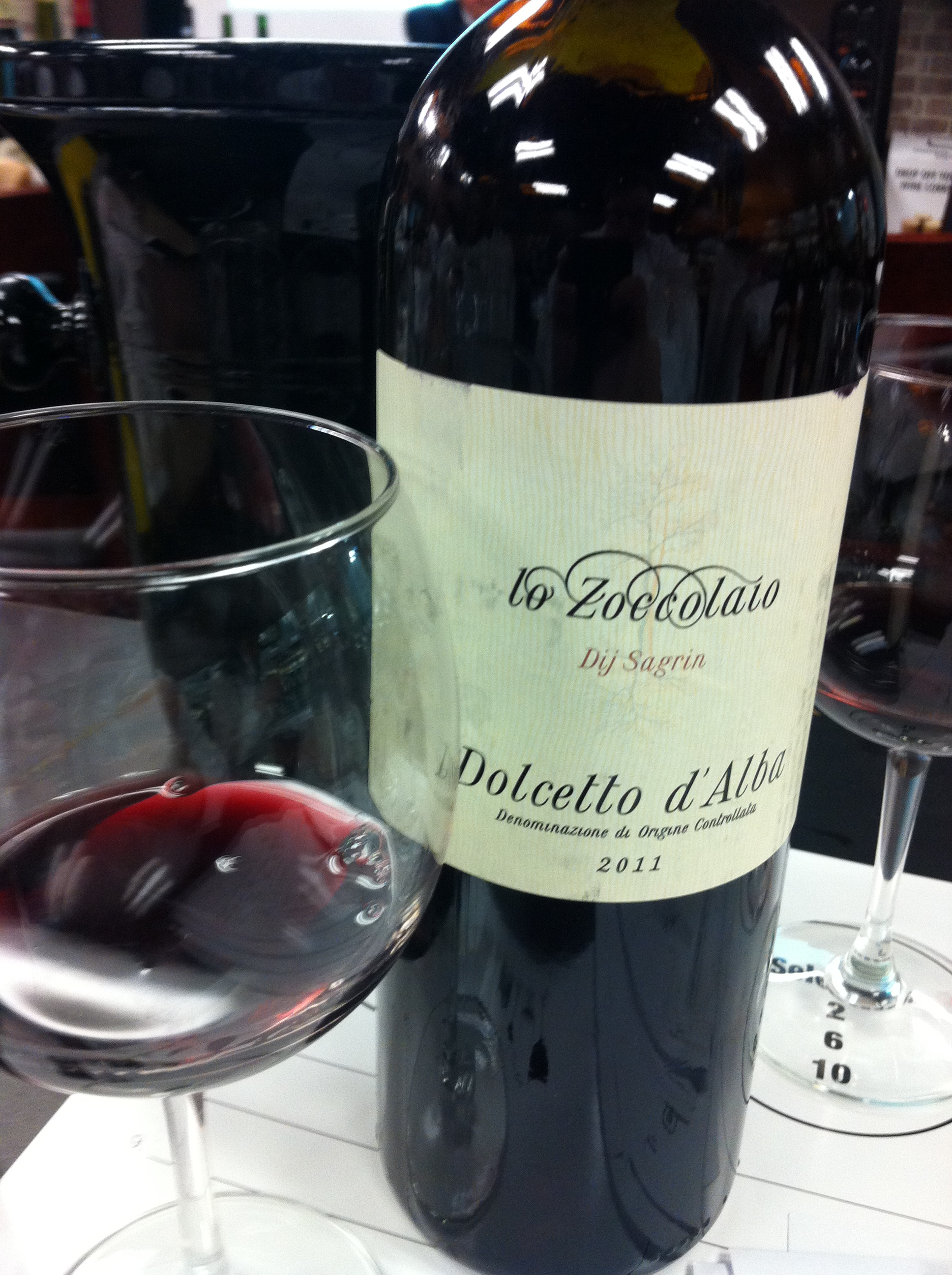
A Dolcetto d'Alba from Piedmont

Dolcetto wines are known for black cherry and liquorice with some prune flavours, and a characteristically bitter finish reminiscent of almonds. While the name implies sweetness, the wines are normally dry. The tannic nature of the grape contributes to a characteristic bitter finish. The dark purple skin of Dolcetto grapes has high amounts of anthocyanins, which require only a short maceration time with the skin to produce a dark-coloured wine. The amount of skin contact affects the resulting tannin levels in the wine, with most winemakers preferring to limit maceration time to as short as possible. During fermentation, the wine is prone to the wine fault of reduction.

== Food pairing ==
Overall, Dolcetto is considered a light easy drinking red wine that pairs well with pastas and pizza dishes.

== Synonyms and homonyms ==
Acqui, Barbirono, Bathiolin, Batialin, Beina, Bignola, Bignona, Bignonia, Bignonina, Bourdon Noir, Cassolo, Charbonneau, Charbono, Chasselas Noir, Cote Rouge Merille, Crete de Coq, Debili Rifosk, Dolcedo Rotstieliger, Dolceto, Dolcetta Nera, Dolcetto A Raspe Verde, Dolcetto A Raspo Rosso, Dolcetto Nero, Dolcetto Piemontese, Dolchetto, Dolcino Nero, Dolciut, Dolsin, Dolsin Raro, Dolzin, Dolzino, Dosset, Gros Noir de Montelimar, Gros Plant, Maennlicher Refosco, Mauvais Noir, Montelimar, Monteuse, Montmelian, Mosciolino, Nebbiolo (dialect Nibièu, in the Tortonese and the hills of the Oltrepò Pavese) Nera Dolce, Nibio, Noirin D'Espagne, Nord Du Lot Et Garonne, Ocanette, Orincasca, Ormeasca (at Ormea and Pieve di Teco), Ormeasco (Liguria), Picot Rouge, Plant de Calarin, Plant de Chapareillan, Plant de Moirans, Plant de Montmelian, Plant de Provence, Plant de Savoie, Plant de Turin, Plant du Roi, Premasto, Primaticcio, Primitivo Nero, Promotico, Provençal, Ravanellino, Refork, Refork Debeli, Refork Male, Refosk Debeli, Rotstieliger Dolcedo, Savoyard, Turin, Turino, Uva d'Acqui, Uva d'Acquia, Uva del Monferrato, Uva di Ovada, Uva di Roccagrimalda, and Dolsin Nero.

The Dolcetto di Boca, grown in Novara, is quite distinct while the rare Piedmontese Dolcetto Bianco is an unrelated white grape.

== See also ==
- Negroamaro - a similar grape from Apulia
- List of Italian grape varieties
