= Barolo (disambiguation) =

Barolo is an Italian red wine produced in the Barolo area of Piedmont.

Barolo may also refer to:

- Barolo, Piedmont, a comune in the Province of Cuneo, Piedmont, Italy
- Barolo Castle (or Falletti Castle), a castle in Barolo, Piedmont
- Elena Barolo (born 1982), Italian actress, showgirl and blogger
- Palacio Barolo, a landmark office building in Buenos Aires, Argentina
