= Barolo =

Type of Italian red wine

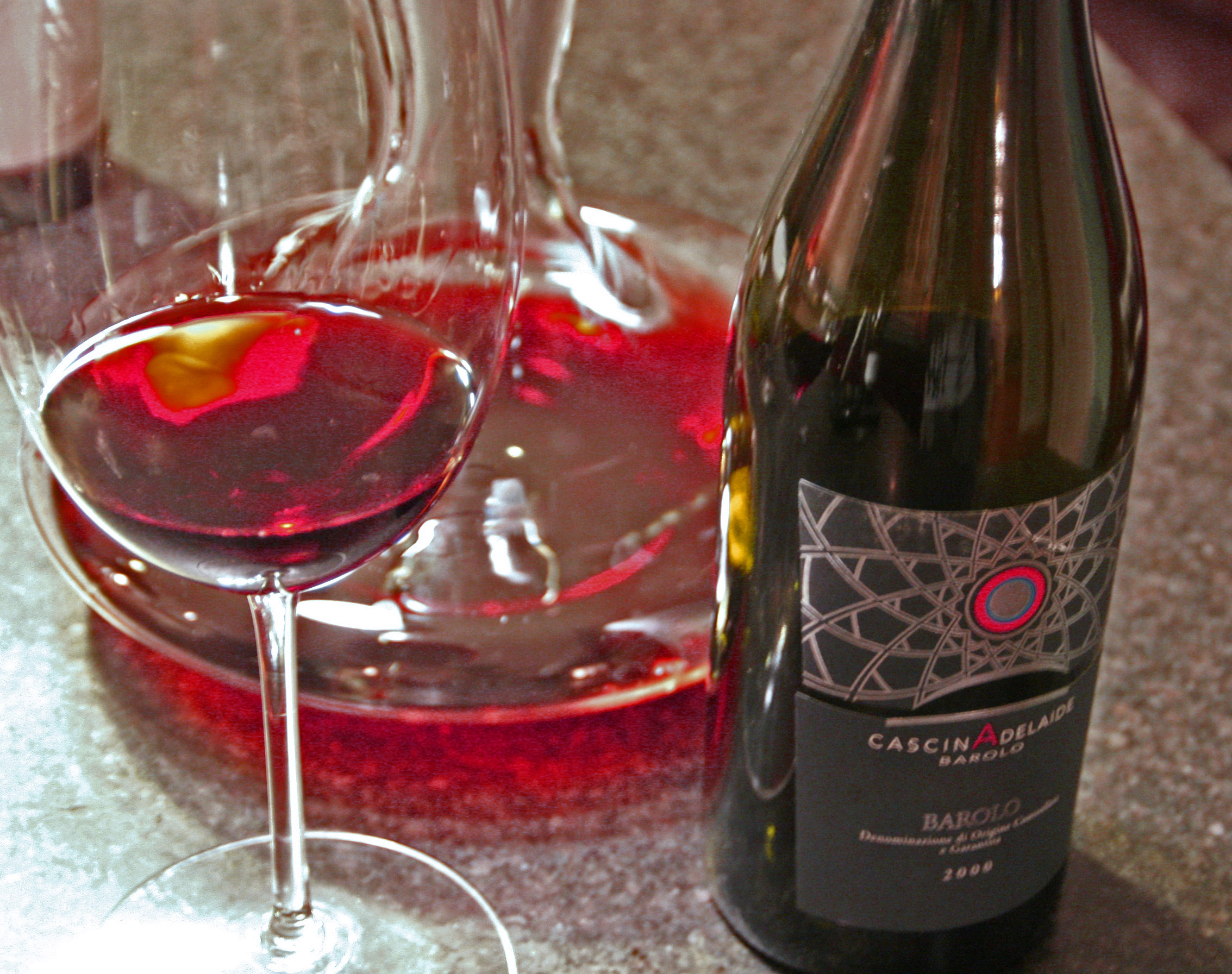
Barolo, like most nebbiolo-based wines, is known for its light colour and lack of opacity.

Barolo (/bəˈroʊloʊ/ bə-ROH-loh, US also /bɑːˈ-/ bar-OH-loh, Italian: [baˈrɔːlo]; Piedmontese: bareul [baˈrøl]) is a red denominazione di origine controllata e garantita (DOCG) wine produced in the northern Italian region of Piedmont. It is made from the nebbiolo grape and is often described as one of Italy's greatest wines.

The zone of production extends into the communes of Barolo, Castiglione Falletto, Serralunga d'Alba and parts of the communes of Cherasco, Diano d'Alba, Grinzane Cavour, La Morra, Monforte d'Alba, Novello, Roddi, and Verduno, all in the province of Cuneo, south-west of Alba. Although production codes have always stipulated that vineyards must be located on hillsides, the most recent revision of the production code released in 2010 goes further, categorically excluding valley floors, humid and flat areas, areas without sufficient sunlight, and areas with full-on northern exposures.

Barolo is often described as having the aromas of tar and roses, and the wines are noted for their ability to age and usually take on a rust red tinge as they mature. Barolo must be aged for at least 36 months after the harvest before release, of which at least 18 months must be in wood. When subjected to ageing of at least five years before release, the wine can be labelled as Riserva.

In the past, Barolo wines tended to be rich in tannin. It can take more than 10 years for the wine to soften and become ready for drinking. Fermenting wine sits on the grape skins for at least three weeks, extracting huge amounts of tannins, and is then aged in large, wooden casks for years. In order to appeal to more modern international tastes, those that prefer fruitier, earlier-drinking wine styles, several producers began to cut fermentation times to a maximum of ten days and age the wine in new French oak barriques (small barrels). "Traditionalists" have argued that the wines produced in this way are not recognizable as Barolo and taste more of new oak than of wine. The controversies between traditionalists and modernists have been called the "Barolo wars".

== History ==
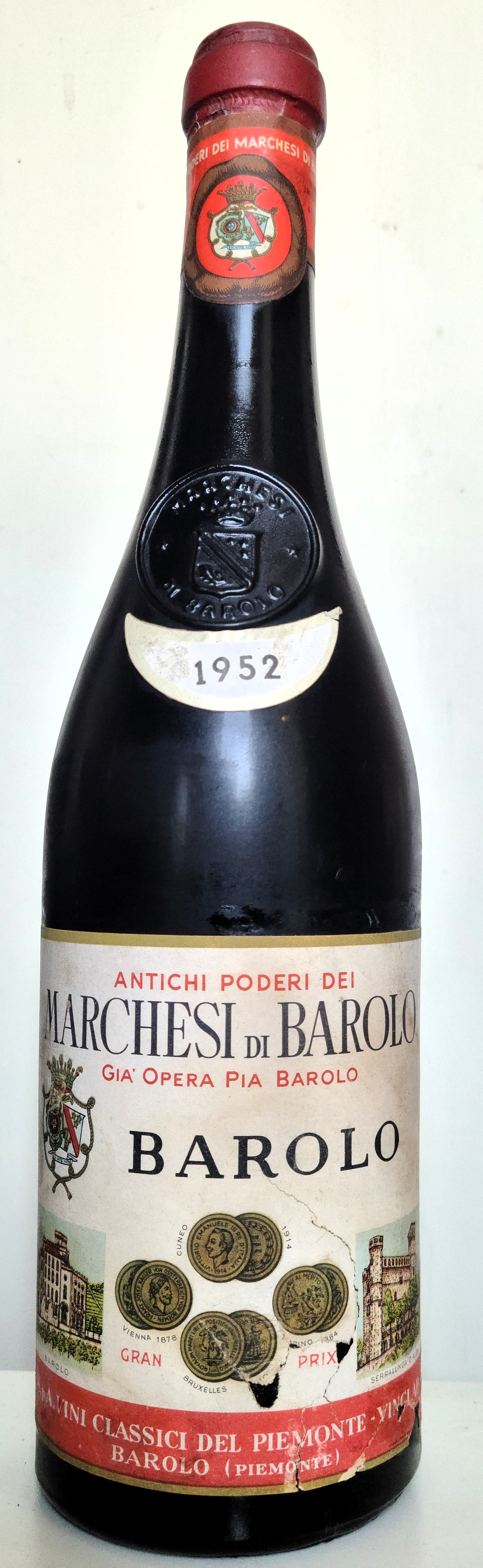
Marchesi di Barolo 1952, first producer to label it as Barolo

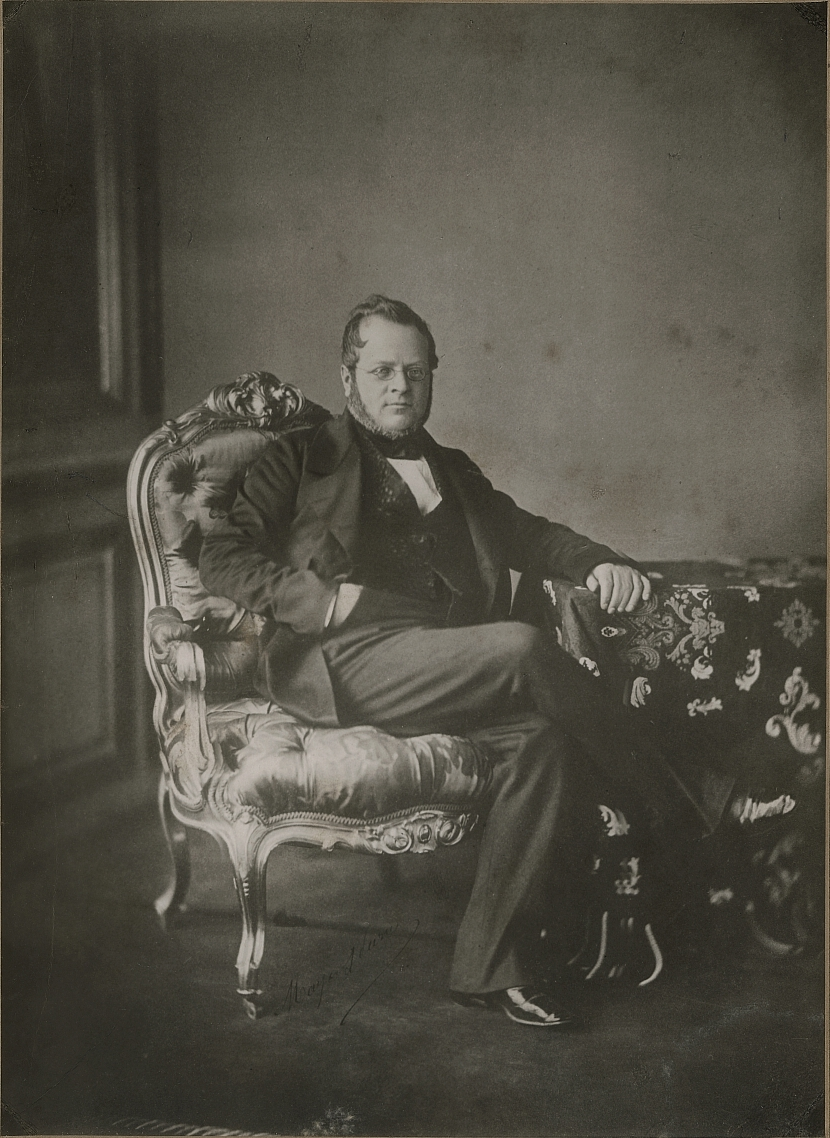
In addition to being a prominent figure in the Risorgimento, Count Cavour played a significant role in the development of modern-day Barolo

Until recently it was believed that up to the mid-19th century, Barolo was a sweet wine. This was attributed to the fact that the nebbiolo grape ripens late in October, meaning that temperatures would be steadily dropping by harvest. By November and December, temperatures in the Piedmont region would be cold enough to halt fermentation, leaving a significant amount of residual sugar in the wine. Another popular idea was that in the mid-19th century, Camillo Benso, Conte di Cavour, the mayor of Grinzane Cavour, invited the French enologist Louis Oudart to the Barolo region to improve the winemaking techniques of the local producers. Using techniques focusing on improving the hygiene of the cellar, Oudart was able to ferment the nebbiolo must completely dry, making the first modern Barolo. This new, "dry" red wine soon became a favourite among the nobility of Turin and the ruling House of Savoy, giving rise to the popular description of Barolo as "the wine of kings, the king of wines".

The idea that Barolo was once a sweet wine and that it took a French oenologist to turn it into a dry wine has been recently challenged, based on new research, by Kerin O'Keefe. According to this revision of Barolo's history, Paolo Francesco Staglieno was responsible for the modern dry version. He was the author of a winemaking manual, Istruzione intorno al miglior metodo di fare e conservare i vini in Piemonte, published in 1835. It was Staglieno who was called upon by Camillo Benso, Conte di Cavour, who appointed him to the position of oenologist at his Grinzane estate between 1836 and 1841. Staglieno's task was to produce quality wines geared towards ageing and stable enough to be exported. Staglieno fermented the wines dry, something that at the time was referred to as "the Staglieno method". Oudart was a grape and wine merchant, not an oenologist, who in the early 1800s moved to Genoa and set up a winery, Maison Oudard et Bruché. By the time Oudart turned up in Alba, King Carlo Alberto and Cavour were already following Staglieno's guidelines and both were producing dry wines. This revised version of the history of Barolo was positively accepted by other experts.

By the mid-20th century, wine production in the Barolo zone was dominated by large negociants who purchased grapes and wines from across the zone and blended them into a house style. In the 1960s, individual proprietors began estate bottling and producing single vineyard wines from their holdings. By the 1980s, a wide range of single-vineyard bottlings was available, which led to a discussion among the region's producers about the prospect of developing a Cru classification for the area's vineyards. The cataloguing of Barolo's vineyards has a long history dating back to the work of Lorenzo Fantini in the late 19th century and Renato Ratti and Luigi Veronelli in the late 20th century, but as of 2009 there is still no official classification within the region. However, in 1980 the region as a whole was elevated to DOCG status. Along with Barbaresco and Brunello di Montalcino, Barolo was one of the first Italian wine regions to attain this designation.

=== The Barolo wars ===
In the 1970s and 1980s, trends in the worldwide market favoured fruitier, less tannic wines that could be consumed at a younger age. A group of Barolo producers, led by the house of Ceretto, Paolo Cordero di Montezemolo, Elio Altare, and Renato Ratti, started making more modern, international styles of Barolos by using shorter periods for maceration (days as opposed to weeks) and fermentation (usually 48–72 hours or at most 8–10 days), less time ageing in new small oak barrels and an extended period of bottle ageing prior to release. By using modern technology, including specialized tanks that allow the wine to be pumped out from underneath the cap of skins and then pumped over, they found ways to maximize colour extraction and minimize harsh tannins. Prior to this "modernist" movement, nebbiolo was often harvested slightly unripe and at high yields, which left the grapes with harsh green tannins that had not had time to fully polymerize. To maximize colour extraction, producers subjected the wine to extended periods of maceration, taking up to several weeks, and then several years of ageing in large oak casks to soften the wine. Through the long slow process of oxidation, the perception of tannins lessened (such as occurs when decanting wine), but the fruit would also fade and become oxidized. The decline in fruit would no longer be able to balance the remaining harsh tannins, leaving a bitter, astringent wine with withered fruit. To counter this change, some producers would blend in other grape varieties such as Arneis and Barbera to add colour, fruit or softness to the wine.

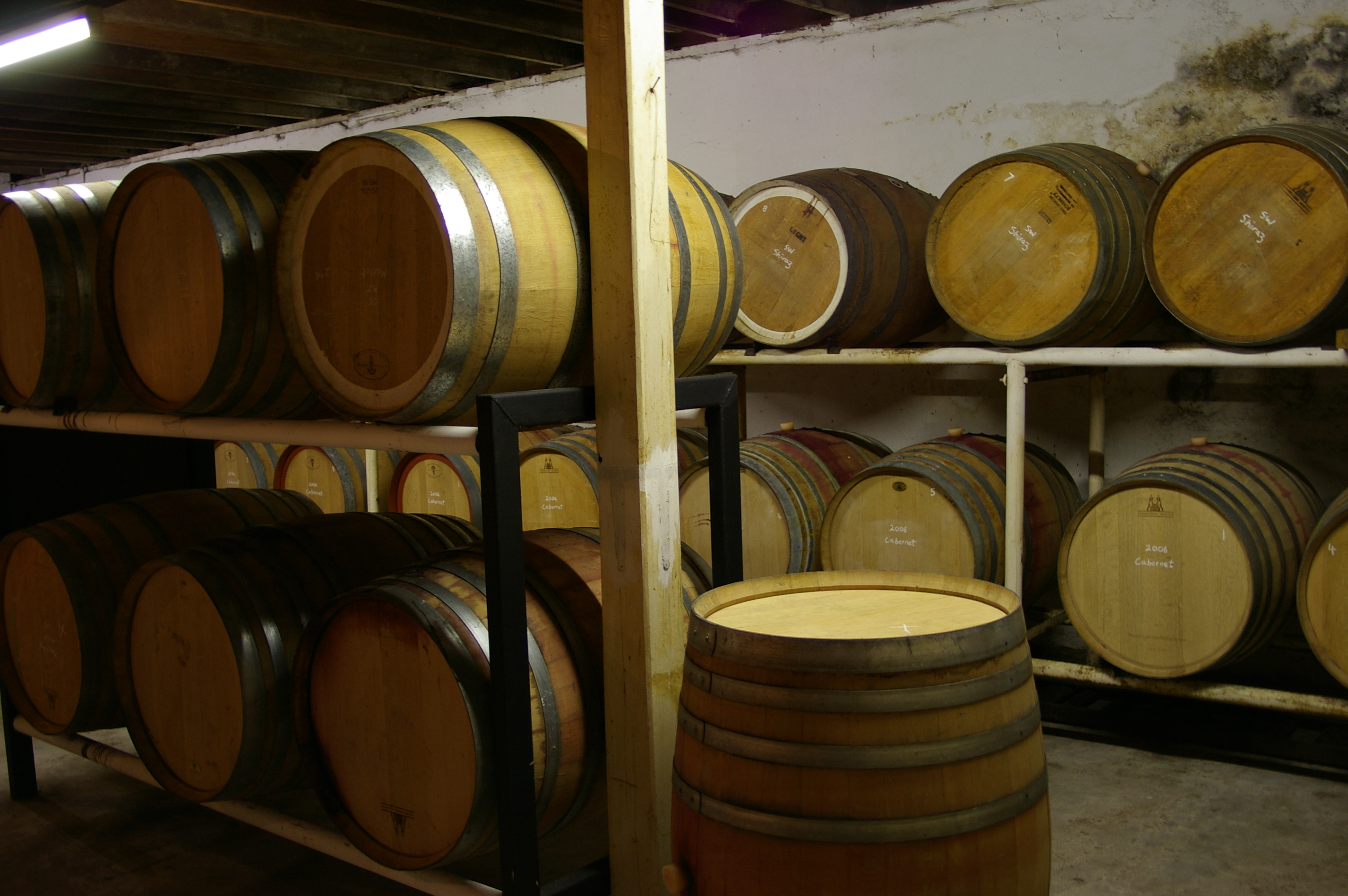
The use of small French oak barrique barrels is a winemaking technique associated with "modernist" Barolo producers

Advances in viticulture have helped to bridge the gap between modern and traditional producers. Better canopy management and yield control have led to riper grapes being harvested earlier with more developed tannins in the grape skins. As of 2015, winemaking for both traditionalist and modernist Barolo producers includes strict hygiene controls and the use of some modern winemaking equipment such as temperature-control fermentation vessels. Rather than fall into one hardline camp or the other, many producers take a middle-ground approach that utilizes some modernist techniques along with traditional winemaking. In general, the traditional approach to nebbiolo involves long maceration periods of 20 to 30 days and the use of older large botti-size barrels. The modern approach to nebbiolo utilizes shorter maceration periods of 7 to 10 days and cooler fermentation temperatures between 28–30 °C (82–86 °F) that preserve fruit flavours and aromas. Towards the end of the fermentation period, winemakers often heat the cellars to encourage the start of malolactic fermentation, which softens some of nebbiolo's harsh acidity. Modern winemakers tend to favour smaller barrels of new oak that need only a couple of years to soften the tannic grip of the wines. While new oak imparts notes of vanilla, it has the potential to cover up the characteristic rose notes of nebbiolo.

== Climate and geography ==
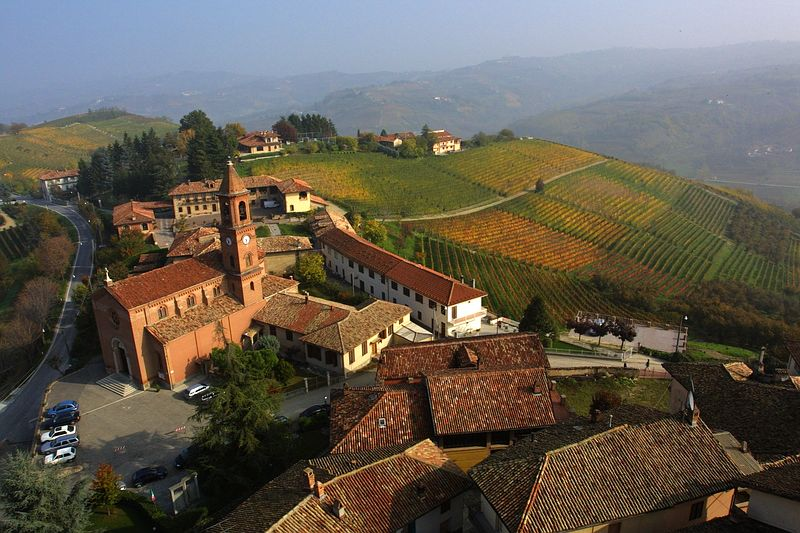
Vineyards in commune of Serralunga d'Alba

The Barolo zone is located 3 km (1.9 mi) southwest of the Barbaresco zone with only the vineyards of Diano d'Alba planted with Dolcetto between the two nebbiolo strongholds. Compared to the Barbaresco zone, the Barolo zone is cooler and located on higher elevations, rising nearly 50 m (160 ft) above Barbaresco. The harvest of the late-ripening nebbiolo grape usually takes place in early to mid-October though some producers are experimenting with viticultural techniques that allow for an earlier harvest in late September. At harvest time, rains and downy mildew are two of the main hazards to worry about, along with early spring hail damage earlier in the growing season. Like most of south-central and southeastern Piedmont, the zone experiences a continental climate tempered by the Tanaro river and its tributaries - the Tallòria dell'Annunziata and Tallòria di Castiglione - that split the region into three main zones. To the west of the Tallòria dell'Annunziata is the commune of Barolo and La Morra. To the east of the Tallòria di Castiglione is the commune of Serralunga d'Alba located on one of the highest hilltops in the Barolo zone. Separated by a narrow valley to the west is the commune Monforte d'Alba located in the Monforte hills. Further upstream north, located in the v-shape spur between the two tributaries is the commune of Castiglione Falletto.

Located among the Langhe hills, the Barolo zone is a collection of different mesoclimate, soil types, altitudes and expositions that can have a pronounced effect on the development of the nebbiolo grape and the resulting Barolo wine. Within the Barolo zone there are two major soil types separated by the Alba-Barolo road. Within the communes of Serralunga d'Alba and Monforte d'Alba is a compact, sandstone-based soil dating from the Helvetian epoch. In the Barolo and La Morra zone, the soils are similar to those found in the Barbaresco zone, dating from the Tortonian period, being composed of calcareous marl that is more compact and fertile. Throughout the Barolo zone there are clay deposits and soil with enough alkalinity to tame nebbiolo's naturally high acidity. In Jan 2007 Filippo Bartolotta indicated how a vertical tasting of Barolo, from 1985 to the present "showcased Barolo's longevity, intense aromatics, freshness, silk-and-cashmere tannins and also highlighted the considerable contrast between production zones".

Being dependent on a grape that is slow to ripen, global warming has had a beneficial influence on the Barolo zone. Theoretically, the increased temperatures of summer followed by mild autumns that promote misty fog that keeps the grapes from burning has helped to increase sugar levels and led to riper phenolic compounds such as tannins. To empirically link this to anthropogenic global warming is speculative. More likely, better vineyard management and winemaking techniques have contributed to a string of successful vintages for Barolo in the last 20 years.

== Wine region ==
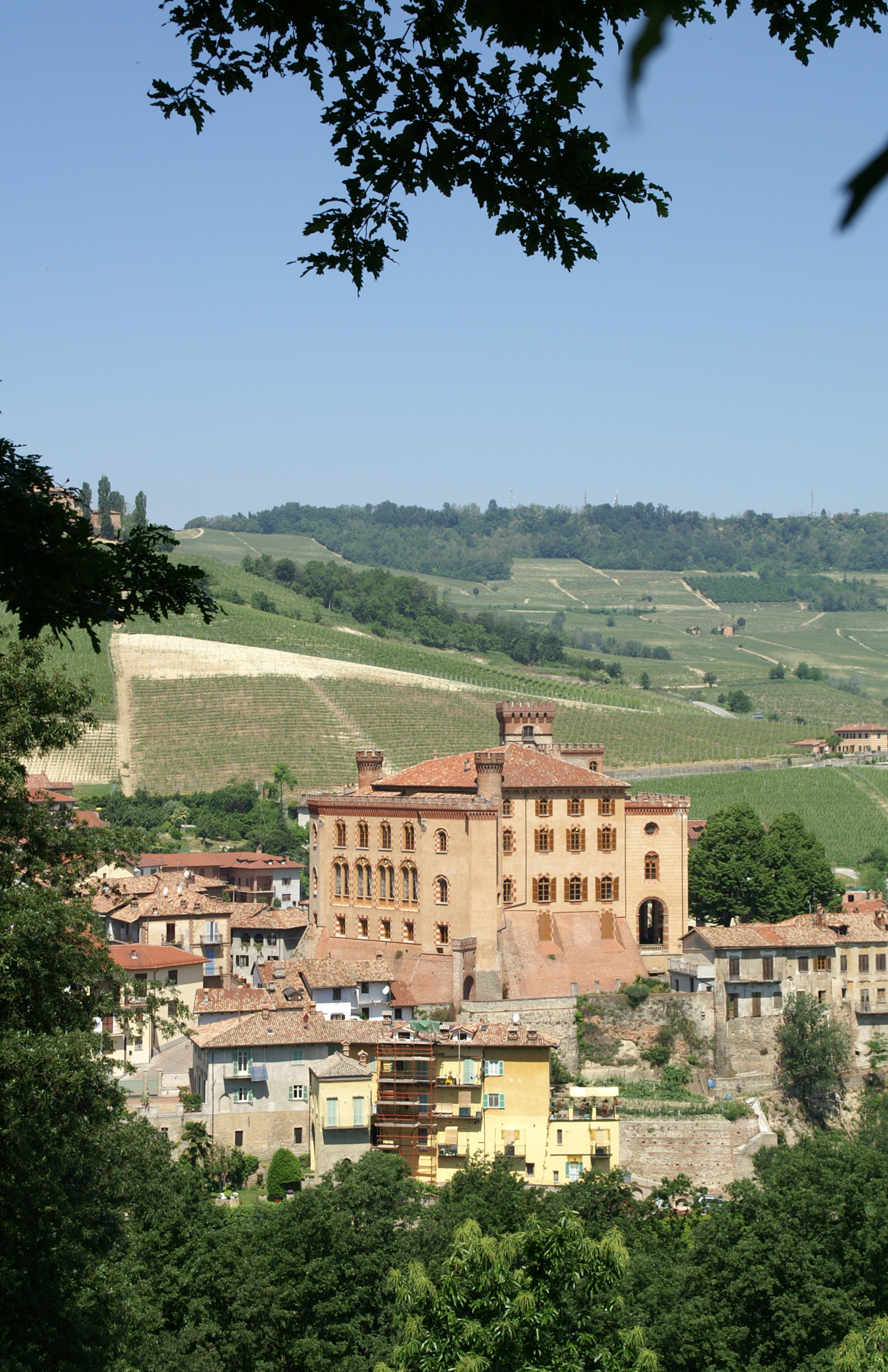
Vineyards in the commune of Barolo

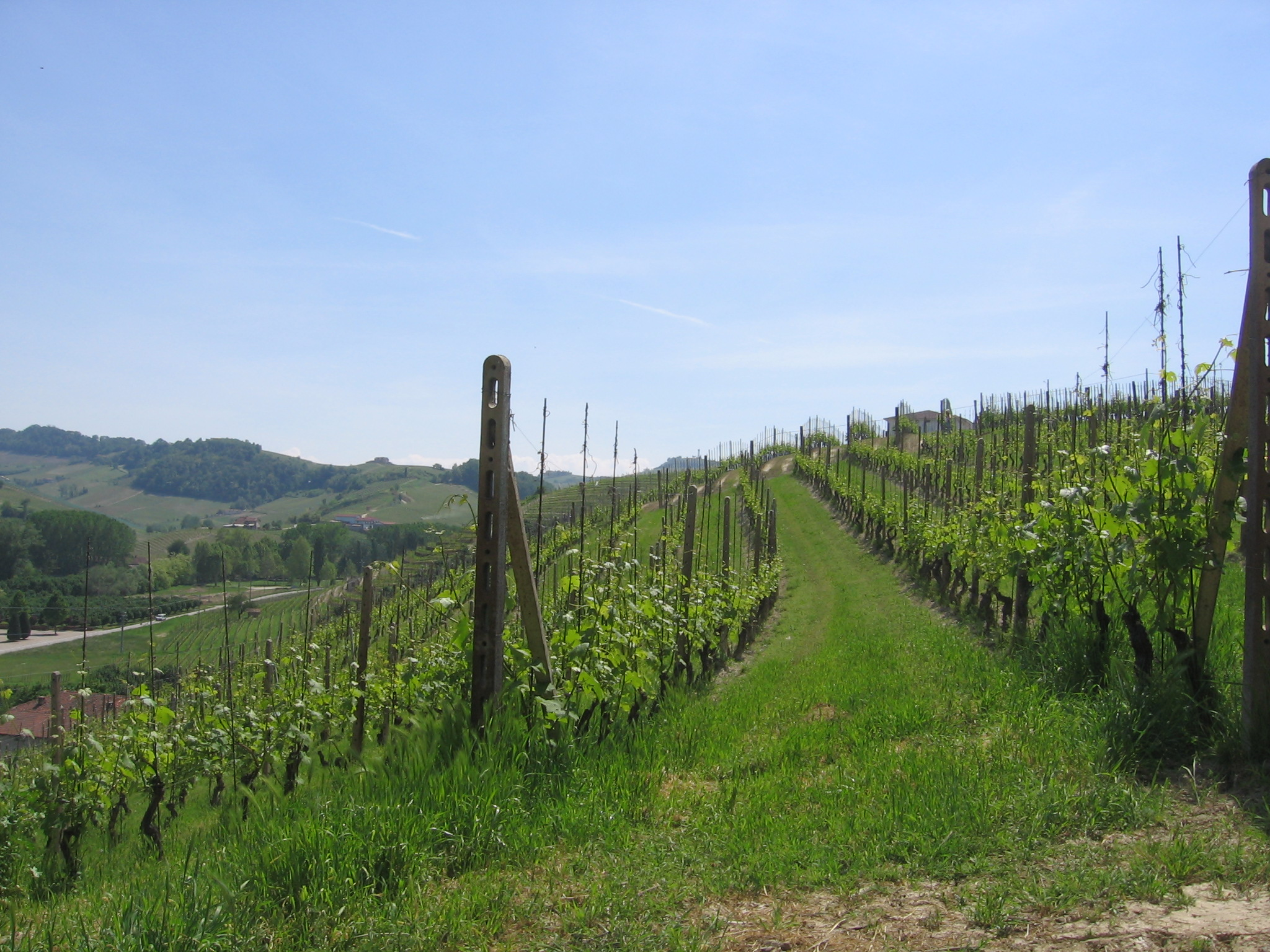
Nebbiolo vineyard on the slopes of the Cannubi hill

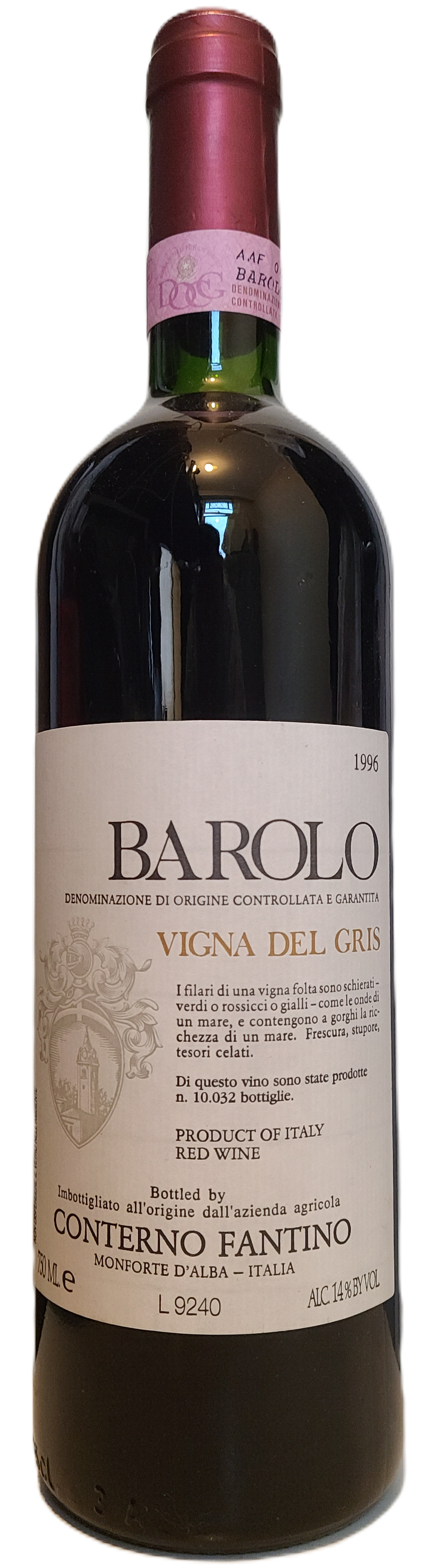
A single vinyard Barolo from Ginestra, Monforte d' Alba

The present-day Barolo zone is located a little over 11 km (6.8 mi) southwest of Alba. While it is nearly 3 times the size of the nearby Barbaresco zone, it is still relatively small and is only 8.0 km (5 mi) wide at its widest point. In 1896, the Italian Ministry of Agriculture demarcated the Barolo production zone to include the communes of Barolo, La Morra, Castiglione Falletto, Serralunga d'Alba and the northern half of Monforte d'Alba. In 1909, the Agricultural Commission of Alba added the commune of Grinzane Cavour and parts of Novello and Verduno to the zone. When the region was designated as a Denominazione di origine controllata (DOC) in 1966, parts of Cherasco, Diano d'Alba and Roddi were included with this delimitation of the Barolo zone staying unchanged through the zone's promotion to DOCG in 1980. Despite these additions, over 87% of Barolo is produced in the original five communes of Barolo, La Morra, Castiglione Falletto, Serralunga d'Alba and Monforte d'Alba with Barolo and Castiglione Falletto considered the "heart" or unofficial "classico" areas of the zone. In addition to restrictions on yield and alcohol levels, to be labelled DOCG, a Barolo must be aged at least three years (a minimum of 38 months from November 1 the year of harvest), of which a minimum 18 months in wooden barrels. For wines labelled Barolo Riserva, five years of total ageing is required (a minimum of 62 months from November 1 the year of harvest), again with a minimum of 18 months in barrel.

The Barolo zone can be broadly divided into two valleys. The Serralunga Valley to the east includes the communes of Castiglione Falletto, Monforte d'Alba and Serralunga d'Alba. Planted with soils higher in sand, limestone, iron, phosphorus and potassium, the wines of Serralunga Valley tend to be austere and powerful and require significant ageing (at least 12–15 years) to develop. The Central Valley to the west includes the communes of Barolo and La Morra with soils higher in clay, manganese and magnesium oxide. This region tends to produce wines with more perfumed aromas and velvety textures. These wines tend to be less tannic and full-bodied than those from the Serralunga Valley and can require less ageing (8 to 10 years). The most widely planted and productive region of the Barolo zone is La Morra, which is responsible for nearly a third of all wine labelled as Barolo and produces twice as much wine as the next leading zone of Serralunga d'Alba.

=== The "crus" of Barolo ===
Since the late 19th century, efforts have been made to identify which vineyards in the Barolo zones produce the highest quality wine. Inspired by the prestige and high prices charged for Grand cru bottlings of Burgundy wine, Barolo producers began separating their holdings into individual vineyard lots and labelling the wines with these single-vineyard designations. The practice became so extensive that some producers were doing single-vineyard bottlings and charging high prices on all their holdings, regardless of whether the particular vineyard quality merited such a practice.

Led by prominent wine critic Luigi Veronelli, there was a push to have the vineyards of Barolo classified according to the quality of their produce. Winemaker Renato Ratti conducted an extensive study of the soils, geography and produce of vineyards throughout the area and mapped out individual plots based on their quality potential. The "Ratti Map" is still widely used by producers and negociants today. While there is no official designation of cru vineyard in the Barolo zone, both oral tradition and the history of high prices paid by negociants have elevated some vineyards to "cru" status in Barolo. In the commune of Barolo, the Cannubi and Sarmassa are considered "cru" class as well as the Brunate vineyard shared with the commune of La Morra. Also in La Morra are the highly esteemed Cerequio and Rocche vineyards. In Castiglione Falletto are the Monprivato and Villero vineyards. The commune of Serralunga d'Alba is home to the esteemed vineyards of Lazzarito and Vigna Rionda while the commune of Monforte d'Alba is home to the Bussia, Ginestra and Santo Stefano di Perno vineyards.

Below is a list of some the traditional "crus" of Barolo (divided by commune):

Barolo
Bricco Viole	Brunate	Cannubi	Cannubi Boschis	Rue	
San Lorenzo	Sarmassa	Via Nuova			
Castiglione Falletto
Bricco Rocche	Fiasc	Mariondino	Monprivato	Parussi (or Parusso)	Pira
Rivera	Villero				
La Morra
Arborina	Brunate	Cerequio	Gattera	Giachini	
Marcenasco	Rocche dell'Annunziata				
Monforte d'Alba
Bussia	Cicala	Colonnello	Dardi	Ginestra	
Mosconi	Munie	Romirasco	Santo Stefano		
Serralunga d'Alba
Falletto	Francia	La Serra	Marenca	Marenca-Rivette	
Margheria	Ornato	Parafada	Vigna Rionda		

In 2010 the Barolo Consorzio introduced the Menzioni Geografiche Aggiuntive (additional geographic mentions) also known as MGA or subzones, after the Barbaresco Consorzio introduced them in 2007. 181 MGA were officially delimited, of which 170 were vineyard areas and 11 were village designations. Following the introductions of MGA for Barolo (and Barbaresco) the term Vigna (Italian for vineyard) can be used on labels after its respective MGA and only if the vineyard is within one of the approved official geographic mentions.

== Grape and wines ==
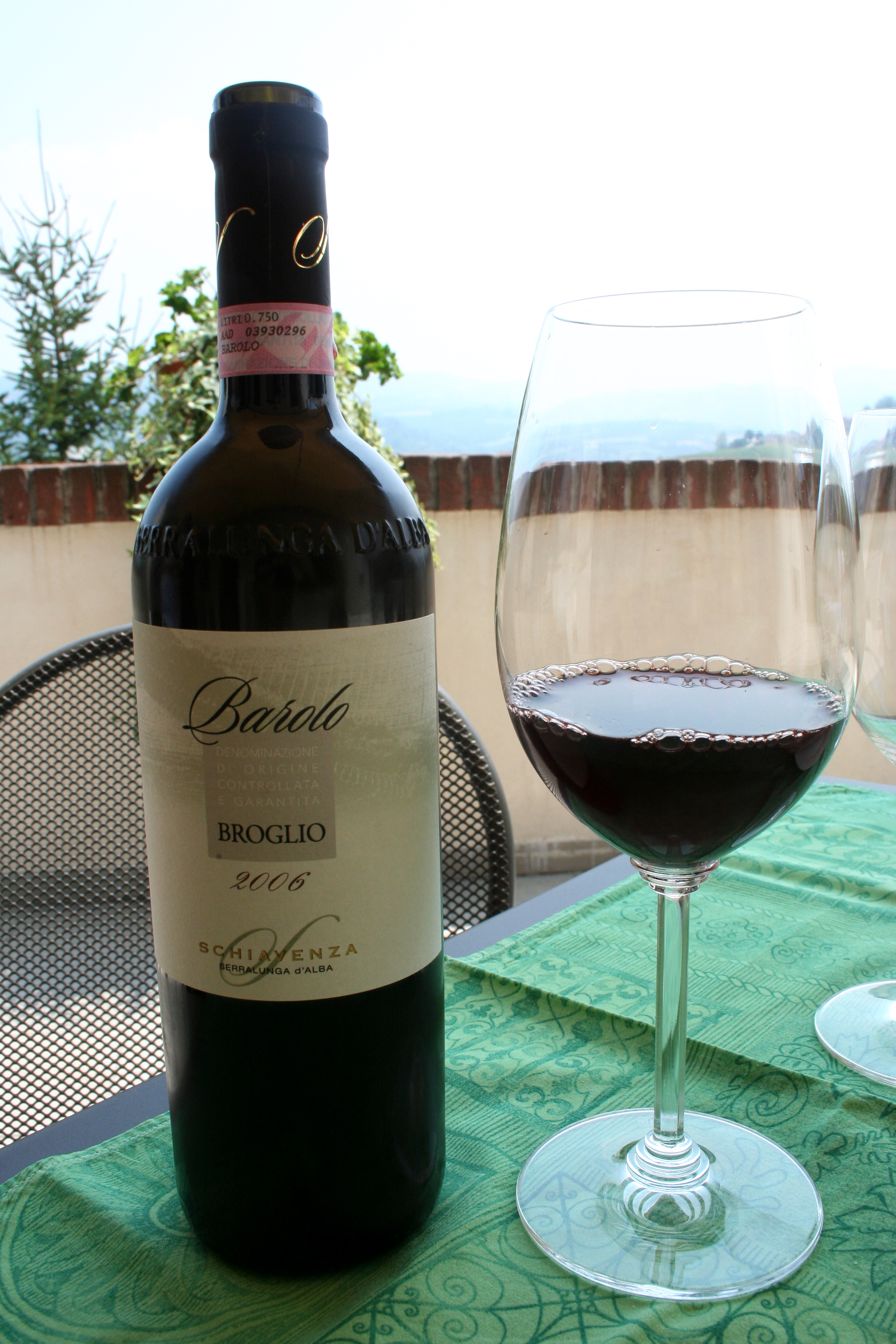
A glass of Barolo from Piedmont

Barolo wine is produced from the nebbiolo grape variety with the Lampia, Michet and Rosé clones authorized. The clusters are dark blue and greyish with the abundant wax that dresses the grapes. Their form is lengthened and pyramidal, with small, spherical grapes and substantial peel. The leaves are of average size with three or five nevertheless voluptuous lobes. Compared to the annual growth cycle of other Piedmontese grape varieties, nebbiolo is one of the first varieties to bud and later varieties to ripen with harvest taking place in mid to late October. In some vintages, other Piedmontese producers can pick and complete fermentation of their Barbera and Dolcetto plantings before Barolo producers have even begun their harvest. According to DOCG regulations, Barolos are to be composed of 100% nebbiolo. Historically producers would blend other grapes such as Barbera and today there is speculation that modern Barolo producers may be blending in Barbera, Cabernet Sauvignon, Merlot and Syrah but there has been no conclusive proof of this practice. In the 1990s producers in the Barolo zone petitioned that the required nebbiolo content be lowered from 100% to 90% but this petition was eventually defeated.

Barolos tend to be rich, deeply concentrated full bodied wines with pronounced tannins and acidity. The wines are almost always lightly coloured varying from ruby to garnet in their youth to more brick and orange hues as they age. Like Pinot noir, Barolos are never opaque. Barolos have the potential for a wide range of complex and exotic aromas with tar and roses being common notes. Other aromas associated with Barolos include camphor, chocolate, dried fruit, damsons, eucalyptus, leather, licorice, mint, mulberries, plum, spice, strawberries, tobacco, white truffles as well as dried and fresh herbs. The tannins of the wine add texture and serve to balance Barolo's moderate to high alcohol levels (Minimum 13% but most often above 15% ABV). Excessive extraction from prolonged maceration periods and oak ageing can give the wines an over-extracted bitterness.

Within the different communes of the Barolo zone, stylistic differences emerge due to differences in soil type. The calcareous marl soils of Barolo and La Morra are relatively fertile and tend to produce softer, more aromatic and fruity wines that age relatively sooner than Barolos from other parts of the zone. The less fertile, sandstone soils of the Monforte d'Alba and Serralunga d'Alba commune produce more intense, structured wines that need more time to mature. Castiglione Falletto is located on a spur between the two valleys with overlapping soil types. This region tends to produce wines with the elegance and aromatics of the Barolo commune and the structure of wines from Serralunga d'Alba.

=== Barolo Chinato ===
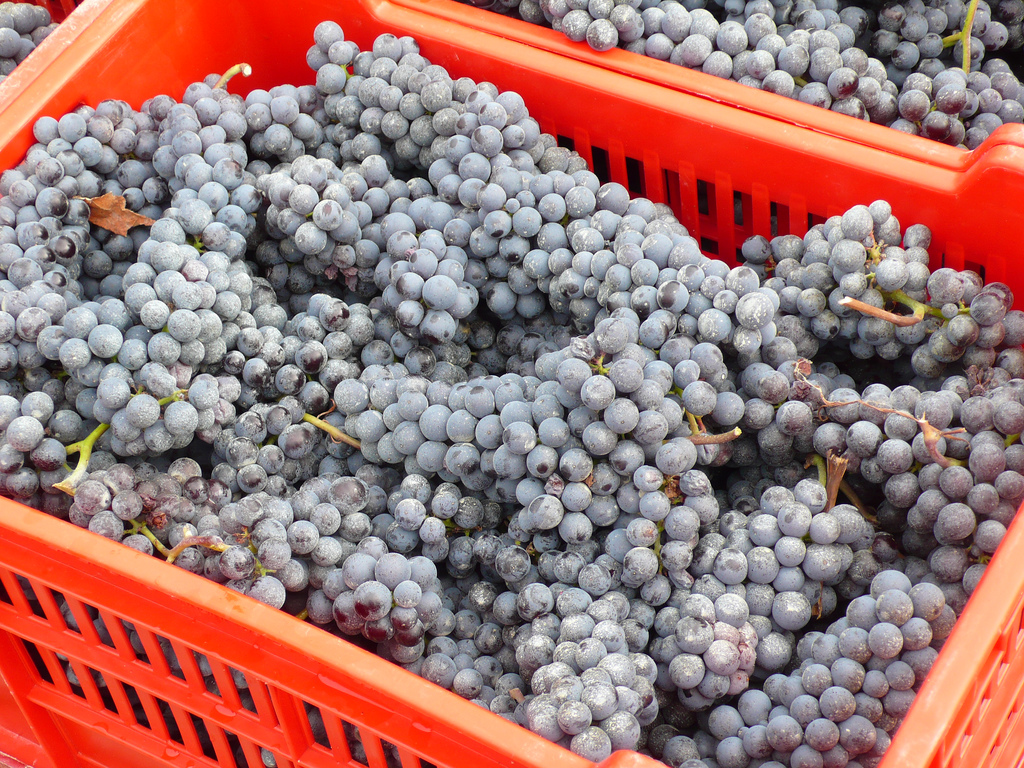
Nebbiolo

In the Piedmont region, old Barolo wine is used to make an after-dinner digestif known as Barolo Chinato. The bark from the South American cinchona tree is steeped in Barolo and then flavoured with a variety of ingredients, depending on the producer's unique recipe. Some common ingredients of Barolo Chinato include cinnamon, coriander, iris flowers, mint and vanilla. The resulting beverage is very aromatic and smooth.

== Production ==
A string of favourable vintages in the late 1990s led to an increase of price for Barolos and, in turn, led to increased plantings. Between 1990 and 2004 there was a 47% increase in nebbiolo plantings in the Barolo zone with 1,734 ha (4,285 acres) under vine. The production subsequently increased from 7 million bottles in the mid-1990s to 10.25 million bottles in the mid-2000s. In the rush to increase plantings some of the less ideal sites previously used by Barbera and Dolcetto were gobbled up. It remains to be seen if these sites will be able to adequately ripen nebbiolo enough to produce quality Barolo that justifies the high price of the wine. Some experts are predicting a market correction similar to what was seen in the 1980s when a backlog of vintages caused prices to stabilize.

== Food pairing ==
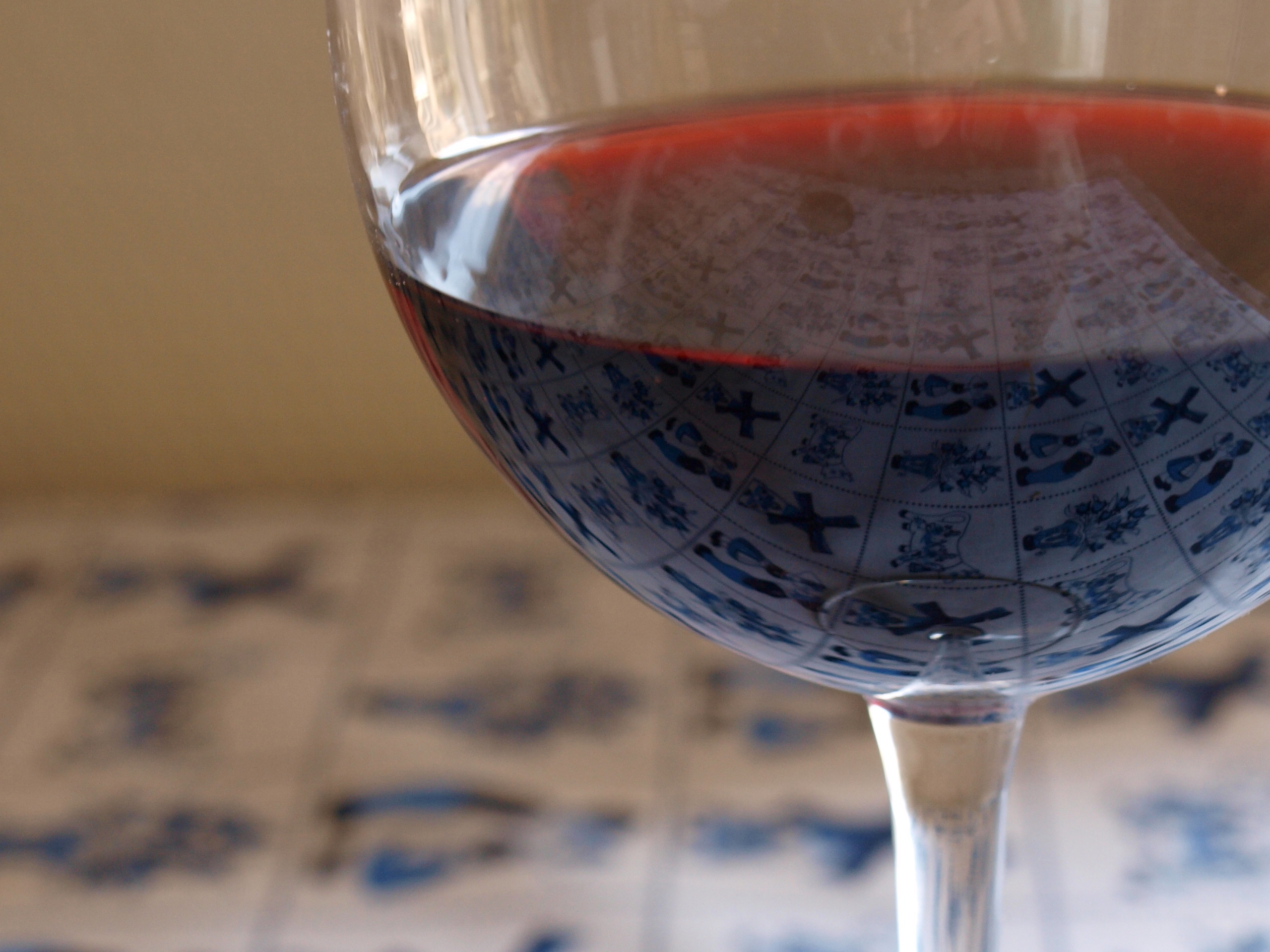
A glass of Barolo with the characteristic brick colour hue around the rim

A big, powerful, tannic wine, Barolo needs to be matched with foods of similar weight. Paired with light dishes low in protein, such as steamed vegetables, a Barolo will overwhelm the food; its tannins will react with the proteins on the tongue and sides of the mouth, accentuating the bitterness and drying the palate. In Piedmont, the wines are often paired with meat dishes, heavy plates of pasta and rich risotti; the tannins bind to the food proteins and come across as softer.

== See also ==
- Barbaresco
