= Dolsin =

Dolsin may refer to:

- Dolsin, a drug
- Dolcetto, a wine
