= Oreste Tarditi =

Italian painter

Oreste Tarditi (15 December 1908 – 1991) was an Italian painter, often painting vedute and landscapes in watercolor.

== Biography ==
He was born and died in Novello, Piedmont. He initially trained in Mondovi under Antonio Cangioli. He acquired a position in Turin with the Corpo di Pubblica Sicurezza. There he met Agide Noelli. After the war, he met Severino Furletti, also a watercolorist, who became a colleague for the next decade. He began exhibiting in the 1950s and 1960s in Genoa, Asti, and Cremona. In 1973, he exhibited in the Palazzo Civico of Cuneo, and in the Biblioteca Civica of Alba. In following years, he exhibited in Genoa, Alba, Cuneo, and Mondovi. Some of his works are on display in the Museo Civico of Cuneo.
