= Bene Vagienna =

- Comune
- Comune di Bene Vagienna
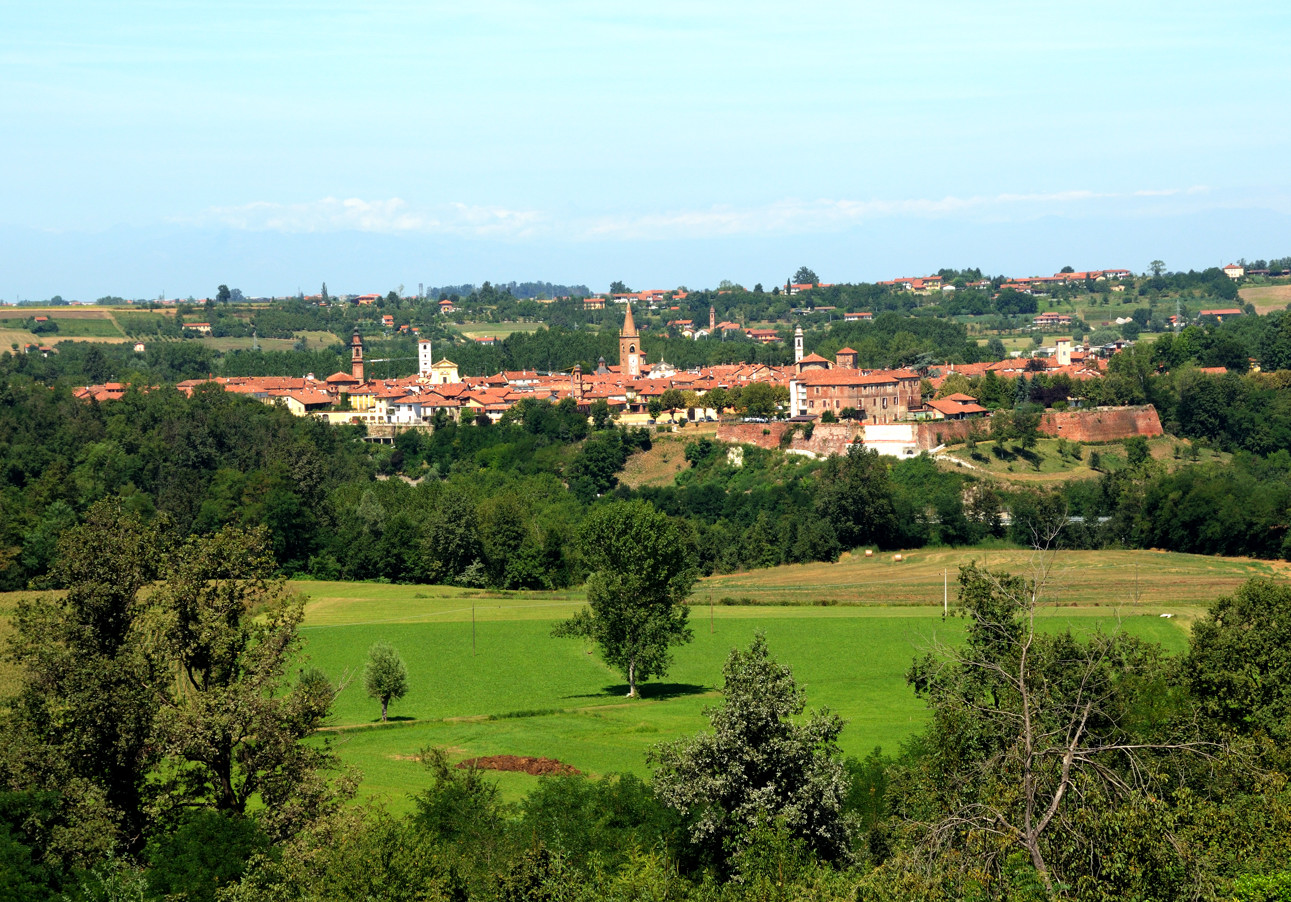

- Coat of arms

- Location within Italy Location within Piedmont
- Coordinates: 44°33′N 7°50′E
- Country: Italy
- Region: Piedmont
- Province: Cuneo (CN)
- Frazioni: Buretto, Gorra, Isola, Podio, Pra - Santa Croce, Roncaglia, San Bernardo, Santo Stefano

Government
  - Mayor: Giacomo Borra

Area
  - Total: 48.9 km^{2} (18.9 sq mi)
- Elevation: 349 m (1,145 ft)

Population (November 2009)
  - Total: 3,652
  - Density: 74.7/km^{2} (193/sq mi)
- Demonym: Benesi
- Time zone: UTC+1 (CET)
  - Summer (DST): UTC+2 (CEST)
- Postal code: 12041
- Dialing code: 0172
- Website: Official website

Bene Vagienna is a comune (municipality) in the Province of Cuneo in the Italian region Piedmont, located about 60 kilometres (37 mi) south of Turin and about 30 kilometres (19 mi) northeast of Cuneo.

Bene Vagienna borders the following municipalities: Carrù, Fossano, Lequio Tanaro, Magliano Alpi, Narzole, Piozzo, Salmour, and Trinità.

== History ==
The ancient town known to the Romans as Augusta Bagiennorum, believed to have been the capital of the Ligurian tribe of the Bagienni, was located in the frazione Roncaglia.
