= Dogliani =

- Comune
- Comune di Dogliani
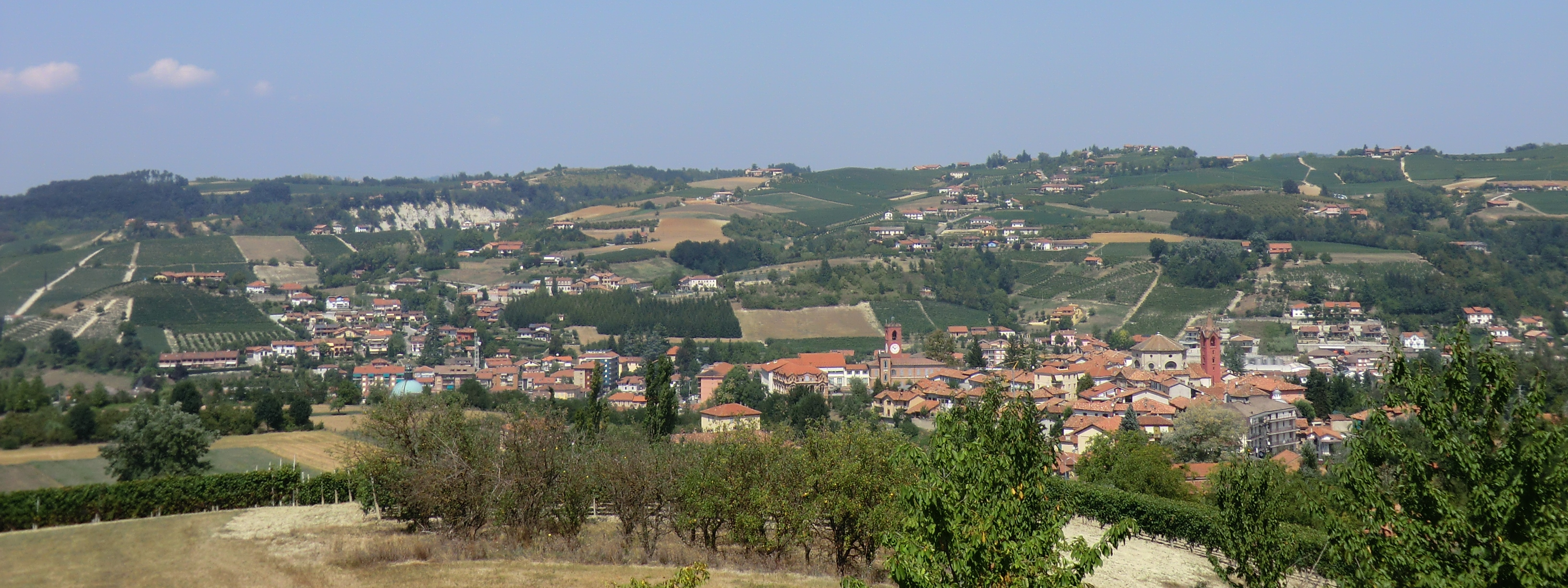

- Coat of arms

- Location within Italy Location within Piedmont
- Coordinates: 44°32′N 7°57′E
- Country: Italy
- Region: Piedmont
- Province: Cuneo (CN)

Government
  - Mayor: Ugo Arnulfo

Area
  - Total: 35.9 km^{2} (13.9 sq mi)
- Elevation: 300 m (980 ft)

Population (9 October 2011)
  - Total: 4,810
  - Density: 134/km^{2} (347/sq mi)
- Demonym: Doglianesi
- Time zone: UTC+1 (CET)
  - Summer (DST): UTC+2 (CEST)
- Postal code: 12063
- Dialing code: 0173
- Patron saint: St. Paul
- Saint day: 2 November
- Website: Official website

Dogliani (Italian pronunciation: [doʎˈʎaːni]) is a comune (municipality) in the Province of Cuneo in the Italian region Piedmont, located about 60 kilometres (37 mi) southeast of Turin and about 35 kilometres (22 mi) northeast of Cuneo.

Dogliani borders the following municipalities: Belvedere Langhe, Bonvicino, Bossolasco, Cissone, Farigliano, Lequio Tanaro, Monchiero, Monforte d'Alba, Roddino, and Somano.

Aside from local craftmanship, the economy is mostly based on agriculture: most of the area is occupied by vines, used for the production of the Dolcetto di Dogliani wine. There are also several woods of common hazels.

Dogliani is also known for its Presepio Vivente, a tradition started in 1975 that occurs yearly on the night of December 23 and 24 where the town's citizens enact the nativity scene.

== History ==
The town was a settlement of the Ligures, a pre-Roman population. The Roman conquered its area around 200-100 B.C, although Dogliani is mentioned for the first time in the Middle Ages, as the place of a castle and a borough surrounded by walls along the Rea torrent.

Dogliani was likely a fief of the Aleramici family, and later was owned by the marquisses of Busca, those of Saluzzo and, starting from the early 17th century, by the House of Savoy. In the 19th century, Dogliani received numerous new buildings designed by the eclectic architect Giovanni Battista Schellino.

== Main sights ==
- Parish church of Santi Quirico and Paolo (1869), designed by G.B. Schellino
- Town Hall, built from 1460 but largely revised by Schellino in the 19th century. It has kept a nave and a portico from the Renaissance church of the Carmine
- Church of the Confraternita dei Battuti (18th century)
- Civic Hospital, another creation of Schellino
- Church of St. Lawrence, originally (12th century) having a nave and two aisles. Later Schellino modified it in neo-Gothic style.
- Church of Immacolata Concezione, another creation of Schellino
- House-tower Perno di Caldera, of medieval origins
- Neo-Gothic entrance to the cemetery, also designed by Schellino (1855 - 1867)
- Porta Soprana, a medieval gate
- Civic Tower (known from the 12th century)

== Twin towns and sister cities ==
Dogliani is twinned with:

- Jarnac, France, since 2000
- Lautertal, Germany, since 2016

== People ==
- Michele Ferrero (1925-2015), owner of the Ferrero SpA chocolate manufacturers.
- Giovanni Battista Schellino (1818-1905), Italian architect responsible for designing eighteen buildings in Dogliani.
- Luigi Einaudi (1874-1961), second President of the Italian Republic, intellectual, economist and founder of Poderi Luigi Einaudi in Dogliani.
