= Narzole =

- Comune
- Comune di Narzole
- Location within Italy Location within Piedmont
- Coordinates: 44°36′N 7°52′E
- Country: Italy
- Region: Piedmont
- Province: Cuneo (CN)

Government
  - Mayor: Fiorenzo Prever

Area
  - Total: 26.4 km^{2} (10.2 sq mi)
- Elevation: 325 m (1,066 ft)

Population (31 December 2014)
  - Total: 3,425
  - Density: 130/km^{2} (336/sq mi)
- Demonym: Narzolini
- Time zone: UTC+1 (CET)
  - Summer (DST): UTC+2 (CEST)
- Postal code: 12068
- Dialing code: 0173

Narzole is a comune (municipality) in the Province of Cuneo in the Italian region Piedmont, located about 50 kilometres (31 mi) south of Turin and about 35 kilometres (22 mi) northeast of Cuneo.

Narzole borders the following municipalities: Barolo, Bene Vagienna, Cherasco, La Morra, Lequio Tanaro, Novello, and Salmour.

== Twin towns ==
Narzole is twinned with:

- Tende, France, since 1992
