= Lequio Tanaro =

- Comune
- Comune di Lequio Tanaro
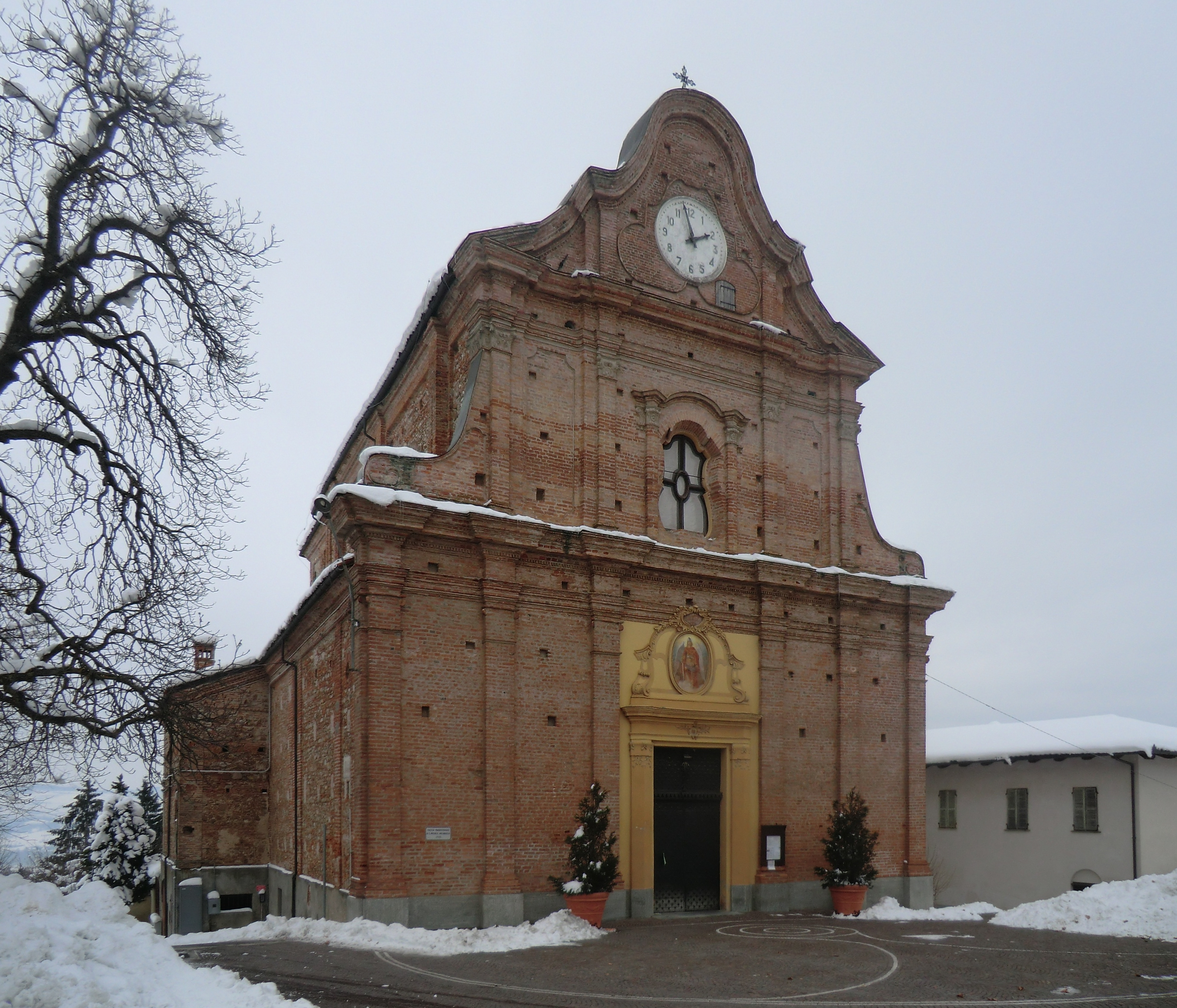

- Coat of arms

- Location within Italy Location within Piedmont
- Coordinates: 44°34′N 7°53′E
- Country: Italy
- Region: Piedmont
- Province: Province of Cuneo (CN)

Area
  - Total: 12.1 km^{2} (4.7 sq mi)

Population (Dec. 2004)
  - Total: 731
  - Density: 60.4/km^{2} (156/sq mi)
- Demonym: Lequiesi
- Time zone: UTC+1 (CET)
  - Summer (DST): UTC+2 (CEST)
- Postal code: 12060
- Dialing code: 0172

Lequio Tanaro is a comune (municipality) in the Province of Cuneo in the Italian region Piedmont, located about 60 kilometres (37 mi) south of Turin and about 35 kilometres (22 mi) northeast of Cuneo. As of 31 December 2004, it had a population of 731 and an area of 12.1 square kilometres (4.7 mi^{2}).

Lequio Tanaro borders the following municipalities: Bene Vagienna, Dogliani, Farigliano, Monchiero, Narzole, Novello, and Piozzo.

== Demographic evolution ==
Historical population

Year	Pop.	±%
1861	1,683	—
1871	1,654	−1.7%
1881	1,560	−5.7%
1901	1,622	+4.0%
1911	1,528	−5.8%

Year	Pop.	±%
1921	1,459	−4.5%
1931	1,354	−7.2%
1936	1,332	−1.6%
1951	1,215	−8.8%
1961	920	−24.3%

Year	Pop.	±%
1971	790	−14.1%
1981	666	−15.7%
1991	629	−5.6%
2001	683	+8.6%

Source: Data from ISTAT
