= Monforte d'Alba =

- Comune
- Comune di Monforte d'Alba
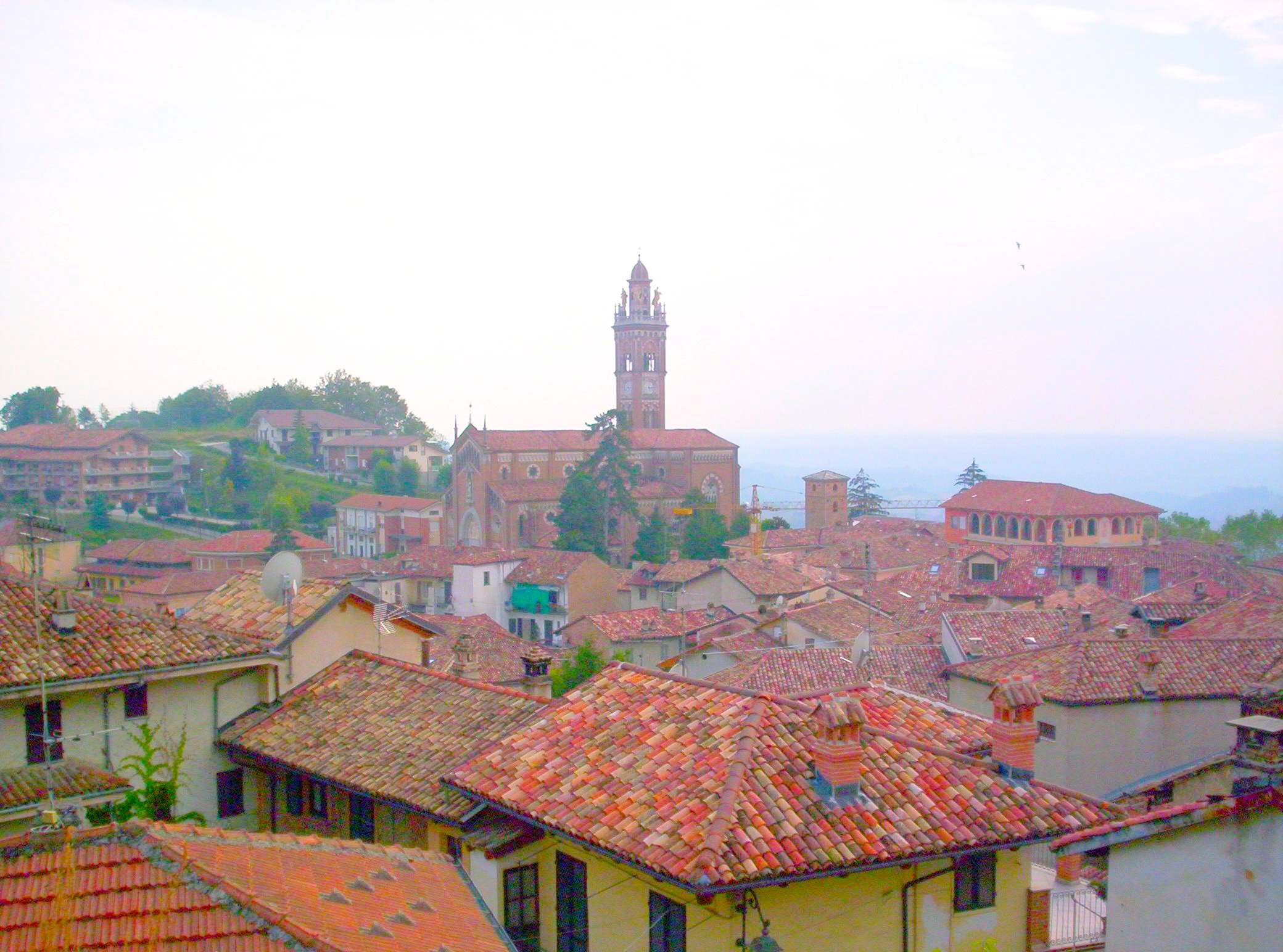

- Location within Italy Location within Piedmont
- Coordinates: 44°35′N 7°58′E
- Country: Italy
- Region: Piedmont
- Province: Cuneo (CN)

Government
  - Mayor: Livio Genesio

Area
  - Total: 25.7 km^{2} (9.9 sq mi)
- Elevation: 480 m (1,570 ft)

Population (Dec. 2004)
  - Total: 1,976
  - Density: 76.9/km^{2} (199/sq mi)
- Demonym: Monfortesi
- Time zone: UTC+1 (CET)
  - Summer (DST): UTC+2 (CEST)
- Postal code: 12065
- Dialing code: 0173
- Website: Official website

Monforte d'Alba is a comune (municipality) in the Province of Cuneo in the Italian region Piedmont, located about 60 kilometres (37 mi) southeast of Turin and about 40 kilometres (25 mi) northeast of Cuneo.

Monforte d'Alba borders the following municipalities: Barolo, Castiglione Falletto, Dogliani, Monchiero, Novello, Roddino, and Serralunga d'Alba.

It is one of I Borghi più belli d'Italia ("The most beautiful villages of Italy"). Monforte d'Alba is part of the zone of the Barolo wine production area.
