= Barolo, Piedmont =

Barolo
- Comune
- Comune di Barolo
- Coat of arms

- Location within Italy Location within Piedmont
- Coordinates: 44°37′N 7°56′E
- Country: Italy
- Region: Piedmont
- Province: Province of Cuneo (CN)

Government
  - Mayor: Walter Mazzocchi

Area
  - Total: 5.6 km^{2} (2.2 sq mi)
- Elevation: 213 m (699 ft)

Population (30 April 2009)
  - Total: 750
  - Density: 130/km^{2} (350/sq mi)
- Time zone: UTC+1 (CET)
  - Summer (DST): UTC+2 (CEST)
- Postal code: 12060
- Dialing code: 0173
- Website: Official website

Barolo is a comune (municipality) in the Province of Cuneo in the Italian region Piedmont, located about 50 kilometres (31 mi) southeast of Turin and about 40 kilometres (25 mi) northeast of Cuneo. As of 30 April 2009, it had a population of 750 and an area of 5.6 square kilometres (2.2 mi^{2}).

Barolo borders the following municipalities: Castiglione Falletto, La Morra, Monforte d'Alba, Narzole, and Novello. Barolo is an important wine-producing area noted for its Barolo wine of the same name, and many wineries such as Poderi Colla have vineyards here.

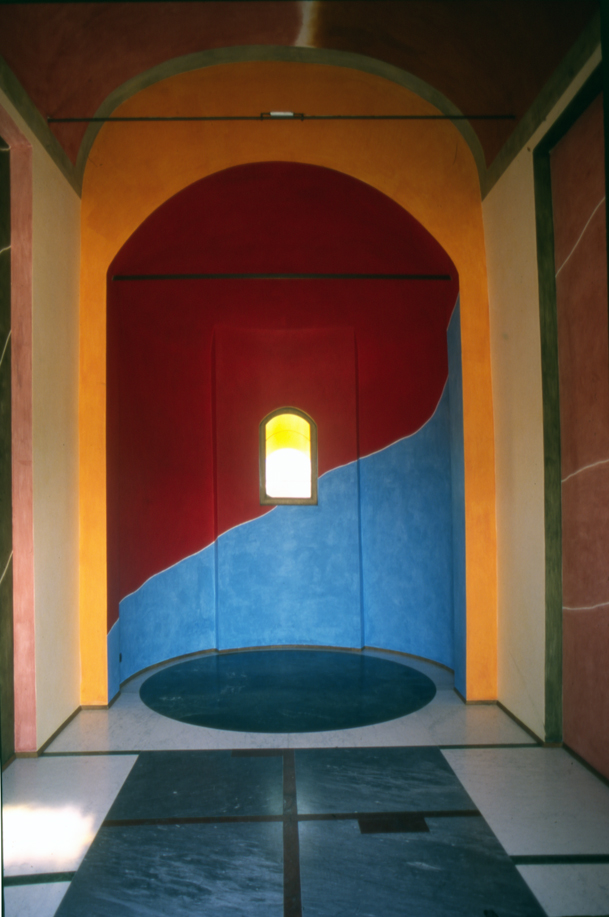
The interior of the Chapel of Barolo

Barolo is home to the multi-coloured art project The Chapel of Barolo by American artist Sol LeWitt and English artist David Tremlett, created in 1999. It is one of I Borghi più belli d'Italia ("The most beautiful villages of Italy"). It is also home to the medieval Barolo Castle.

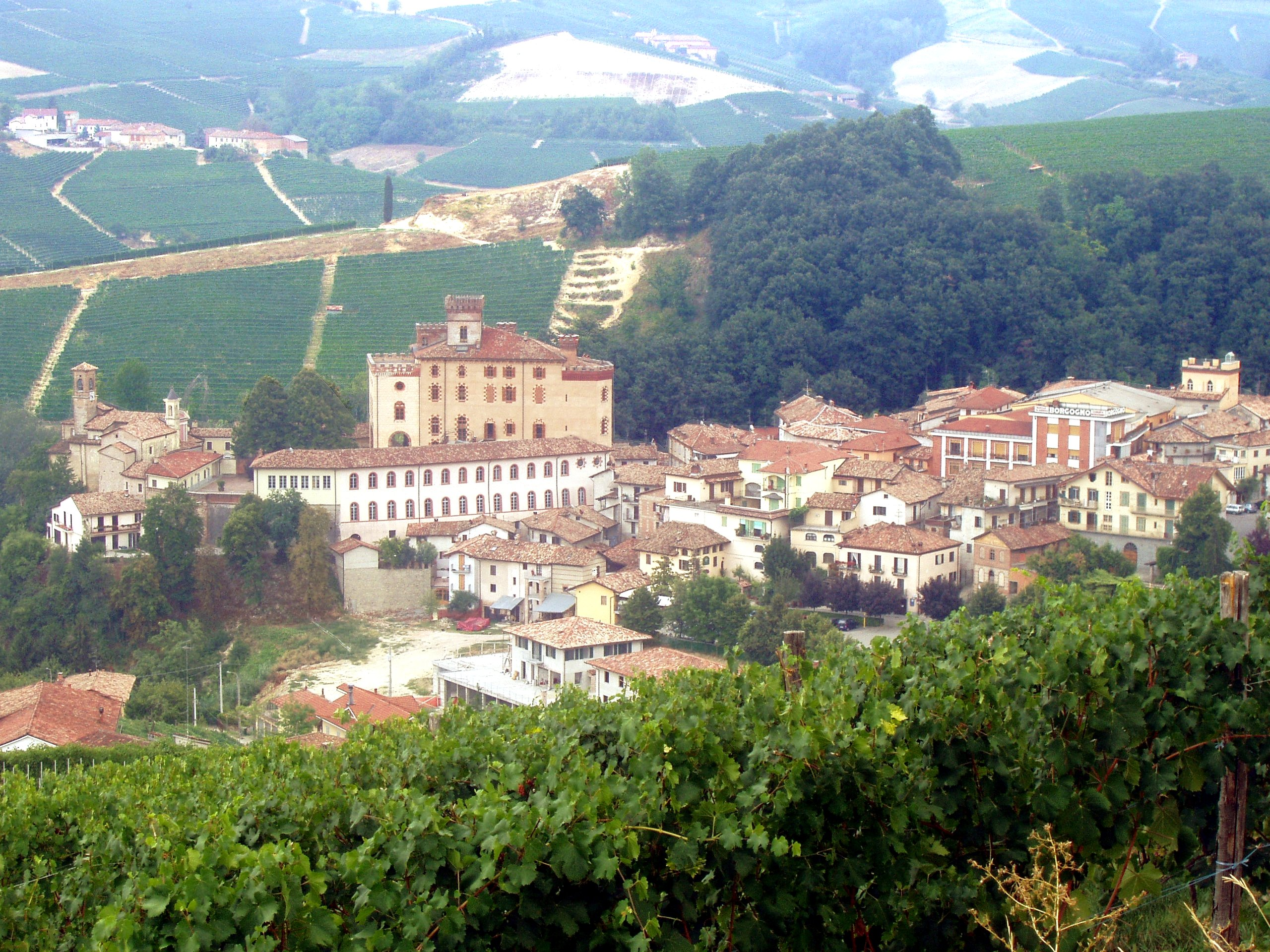
The village and castle of Barolo

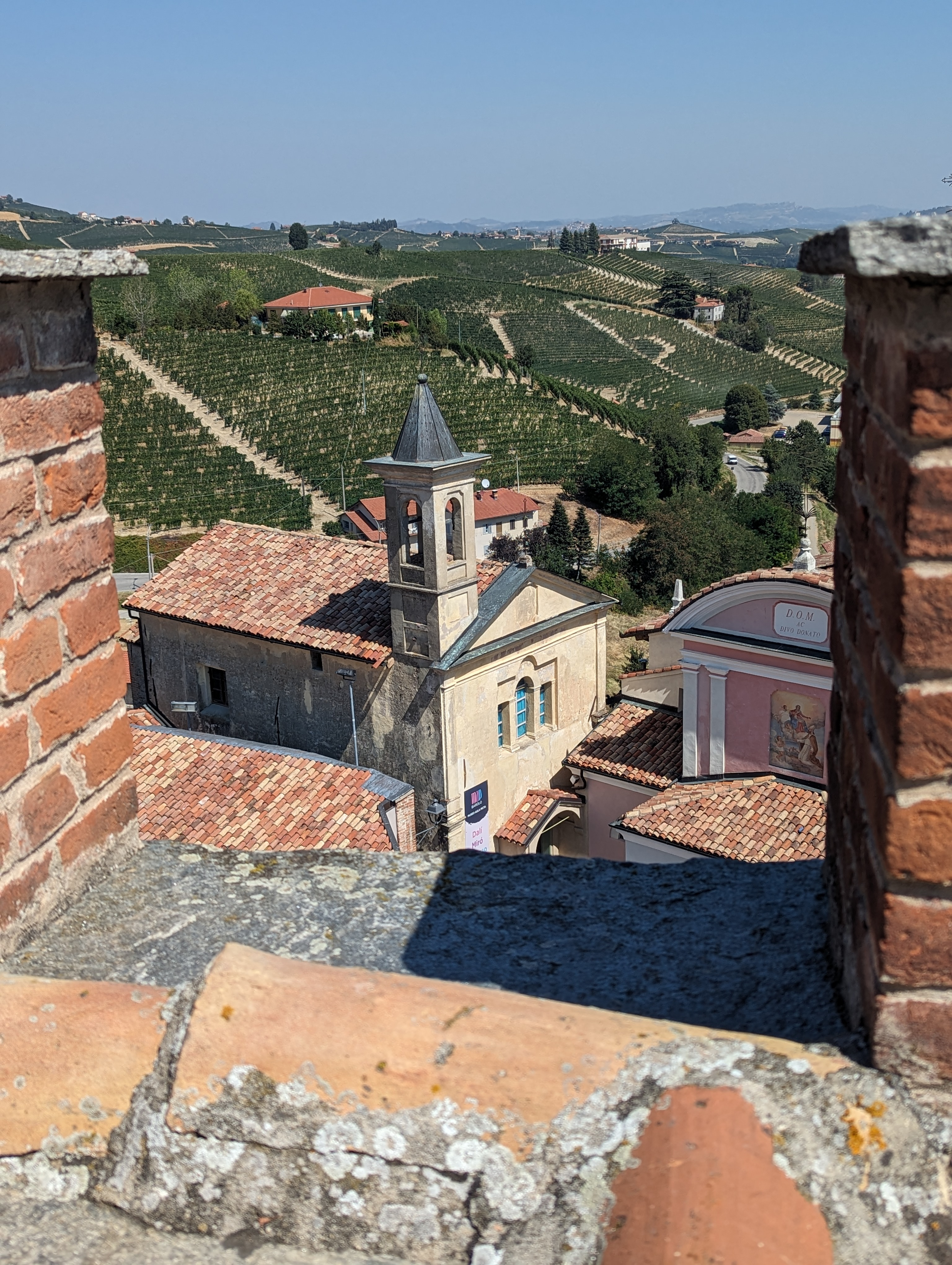
View from the castle of Barolo

== Demographic evolution ==
Historical population

Year	Pop.	±%
1861	735	—
1871	796	+8.3%
1881	914	+14.8%
1901	1,068	+16.8%
1911	1,069	+0.1%

Year	Pop.	±%
1921	1,144	+7.0%
1931	1,054	−7.9%
1936	1,021	−3.1%
1951	893	−12.5%
1961	828	−7.3%

Year	Pop.	±%
1971	759	−8.3%
1981	705	−7.1%
1991	672	−4.7%
2001	681	+1.3%

Source: Data from ISTAT
