= Carrù =

- Comune
- Comune di Carrù
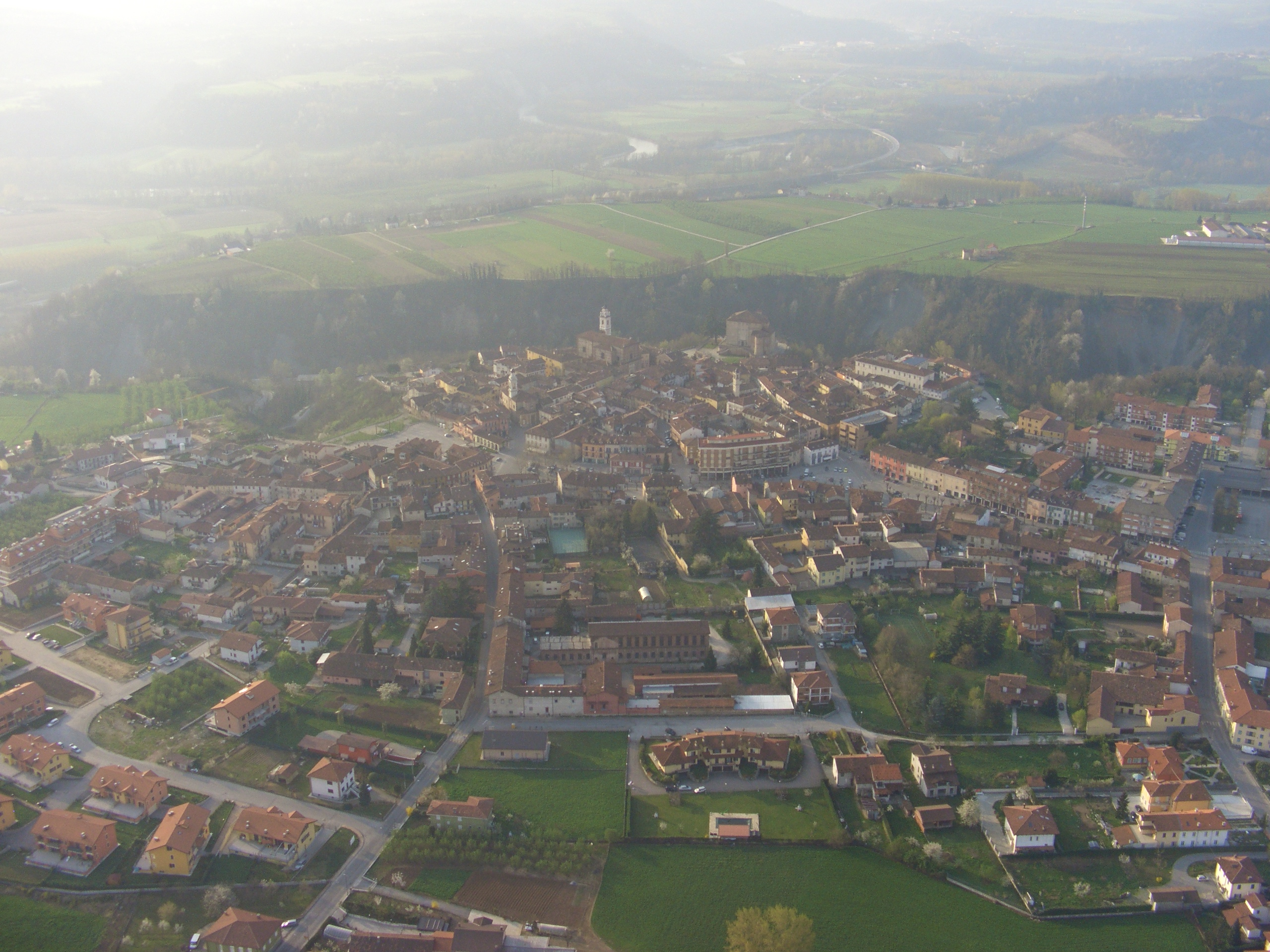

- Coat of arms

- Location within Italy Location within Piedmont
- Coordinates: 44°29′N 7°53′E
- Country: Italy
- Region: Piedmont
- Province: Cuneo (CN)
- Frazioni: San Giovanni, Frave, Bordino, S.Anna, Ronchi, Marenchi

Government
  - Mayor: Stefania Ieriti

Area
  - Total: 26.0 km^{2} (10.0 sq mi)
- Elevation: 365 m (1,198 ft)

Population (31 December 2010)
  - Total: 4,376
  - Density: 168/km^{2} (436/sq mi)
- Demonym: Carrucesi
- Time zone: UTC+1 (CET)
  - Summer (DST): UTC+2 (CEST)
- Postal code: 12061
- Dialing code: 0173

Carrù is a comune (municipality) in the Province of Cuneo in the Italian region Piedmont, located about 70 kilometres (43 mi) south of Turin and about 30 kilometres (19 mi) northeast of Cuneo.

Carrù borders the following municipalities: Bastia Mondovì, Bene Vagienna, Clavesana, Farigliano, Magliano Alpi, Mondovì, and Piozzo. Luigi Einaudi, the first official republican President Italy, was born in Carrù. The town also saw the passage of the troops of Napoleone Bonaparte during his campaign in Italy.

== Fairs ==
Carrù is home to the "Sagra dell'uva" (the fair of the grape), which takes place in the end of September with dances and spectacles, and to "La fiera del bue grasso" (the fair of the fat ox).

== Legend ==
There is a historic legend called "La dama blu" (the blue lady). The wife of the count of Carrù used to go hunting. One day she was out hunting wearing a blue dress and was killed by an arrow. It's said that every last Friday in the month this lady walks into her castle and haunts it, to find her murderer. The castle was open some days a year for trips, although it is now a bank.
