= Barolo Castle =

Castle in Piedmont, Italy

- Castello di Barolo
- Barolo, Piedmont, Italy
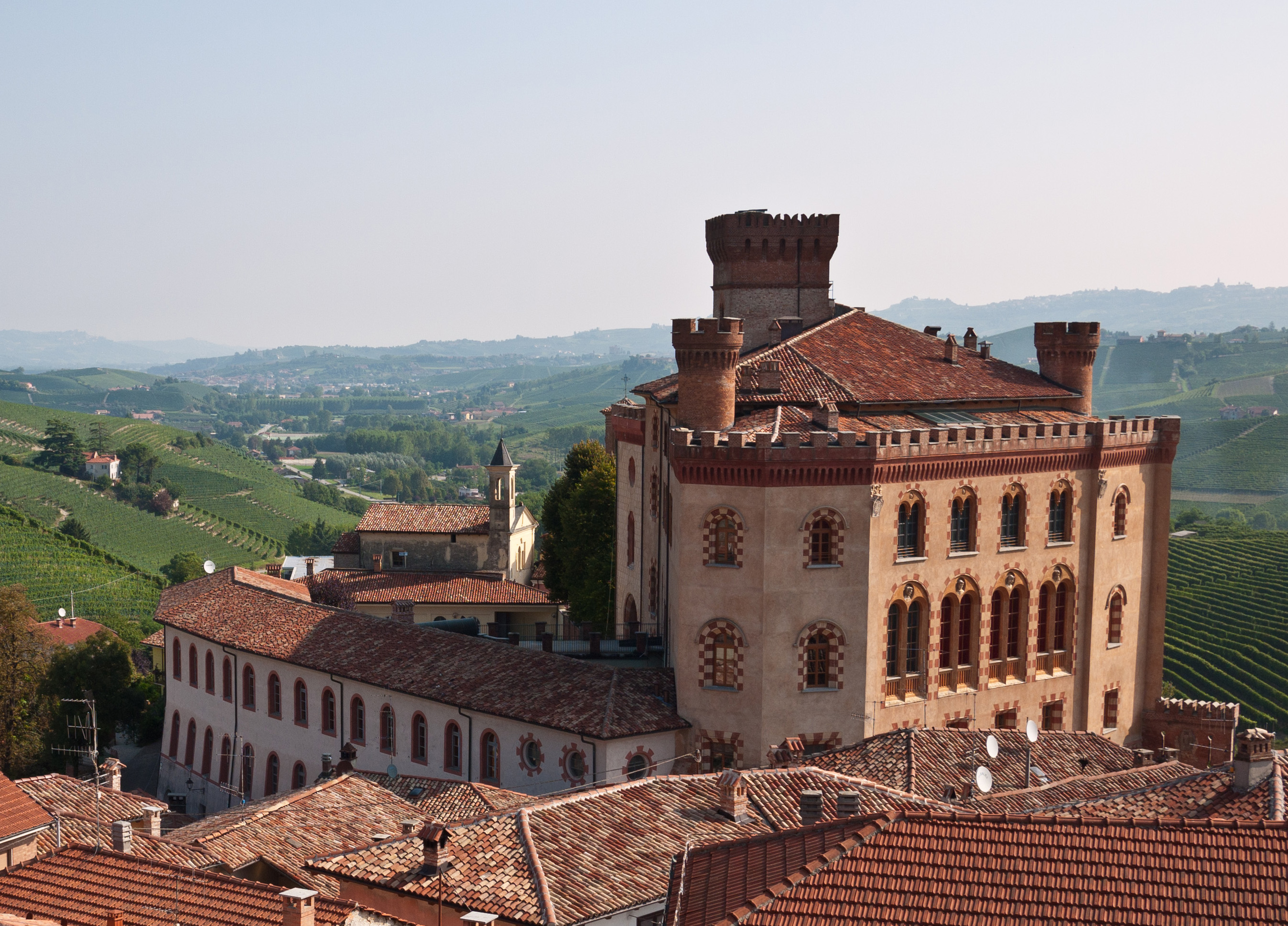
- Barolo Castle in 2010

Site information
- Type: Castle

Location
- Location within Italy
- Coordinates: 44°36′40.68″N 7°56′38.05″E

Barolo Castle (Italian: Castello di Barolo), also known as the Falletti Castle (Italian: Castello Falletti) is a castle located in Barolo, Piedmont, Italy.

== History ==
The oldest parts of the castle, which include part of the keep and the base of the eastern tower, date back to the 11th century, at the time when Berengar I of Italy granted the local feudal lord permission to erect an effective defence against the frequent raids of the Hungarians and the Saracens.

Records from the 13th century show that the castle was transferred to the comune of Alba, from which it was later acquired by the Falletti family. By 1325, a branch of the family had settled there, undertaking major renovations and expansions over the following years. Severely damaged by the plundering that followed the wars of the 16th century, and especially after it was looted by the French governor of nearby Cherasco, the castle was rebuilt with significant alterations by Giacomo and Manfredo Falletti.

In 1814, the Falletti moved their principal residence to Palazzo Barolo in Turin, relegating the castle to the status of a country estate. During this final period of Falletti ownership, one of its most notable guests was the Italian writer and patriot Silvio Pellico. The castle remained largely unchanged after the 16th-century alterations until 1864, the year of the death of Juliette Colbert, the last Marchioness Falletti. After then, it was extensively altered to accommodate its conversion into an educational institution for the local youth by the Opera Pia Barolo, which was established in accordance with the heiress's wish to manage the family estate and pursue charitable purposes.

In 1970, the castle was purchased by the municipality of Barolo, thanks in large part to a public fundraising campaign that received generous contributions from the local community. Since then, the castle has been carefully restored the castle and transformed into a Wine Museum.

== Description ==
The castle is a massive, block-like structure atop a hill, dominated by a central square tower flanked by two cylindrical turrets set within the curtain walls rather than at the corners, and featuring a somewhat irregular plan. Much of its cohesive appearance today is the result of 19th-century eclectic remodelling, carried out when the building was converted into an educational institution.

== Gallery ==
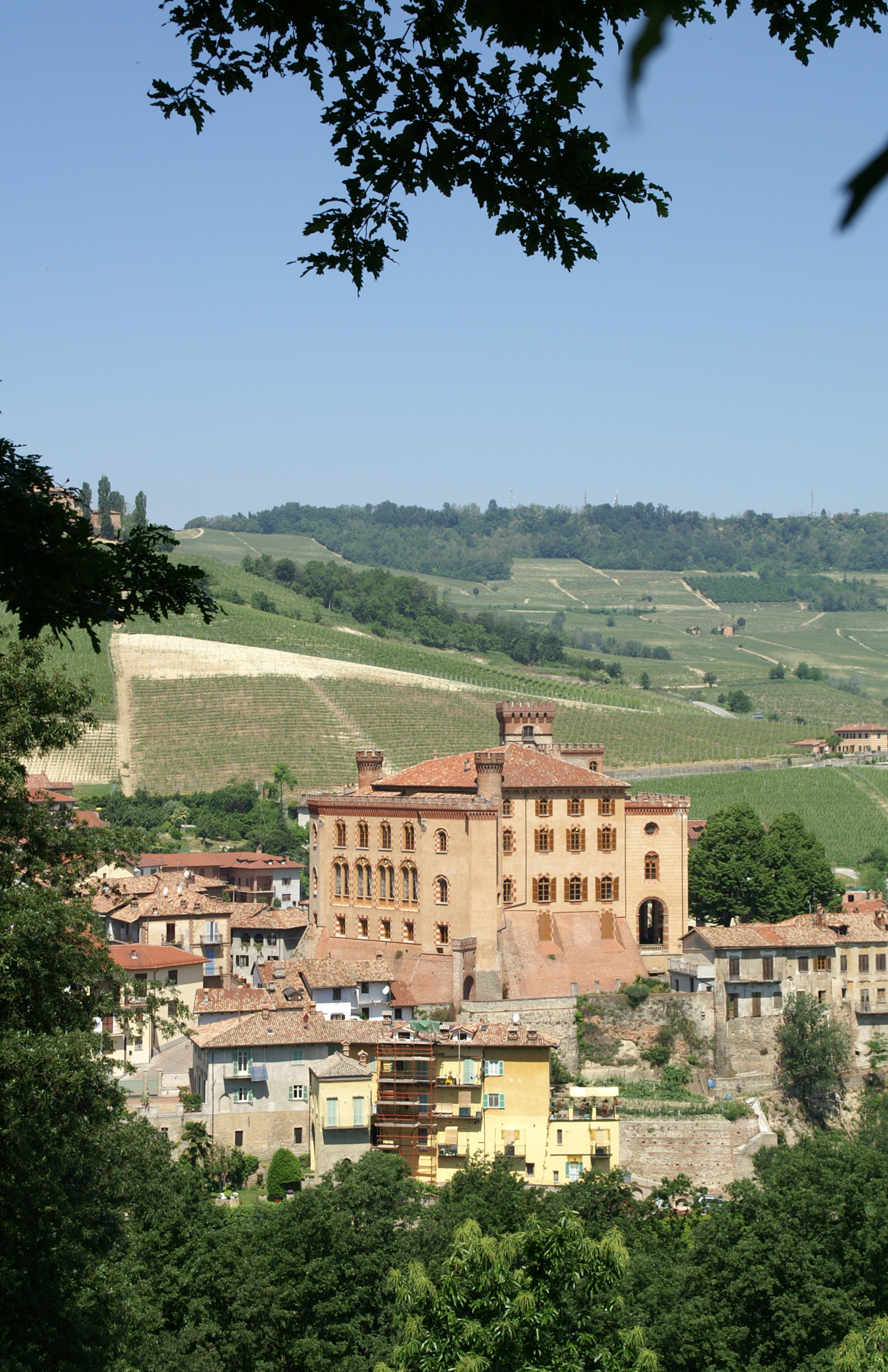

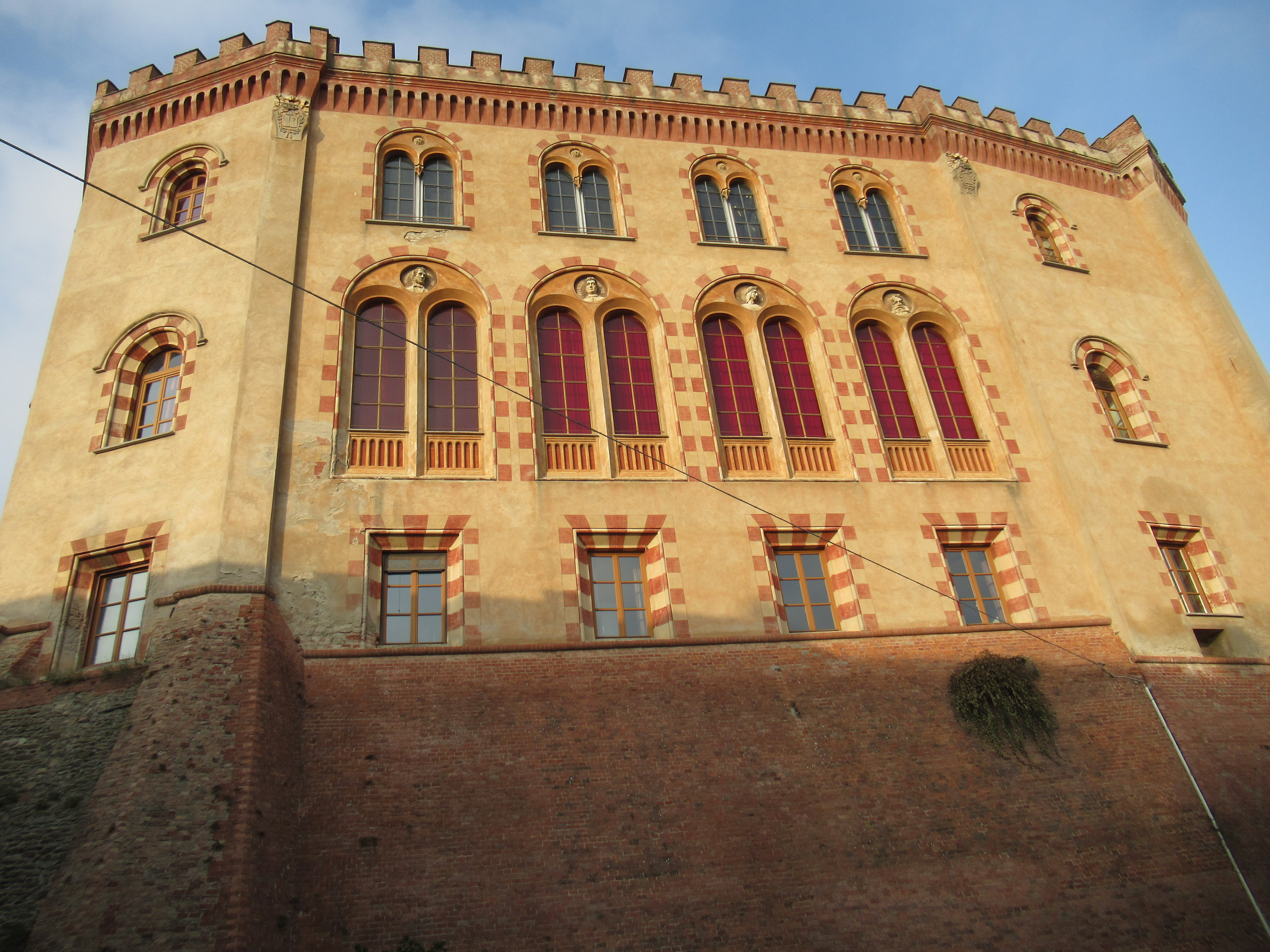

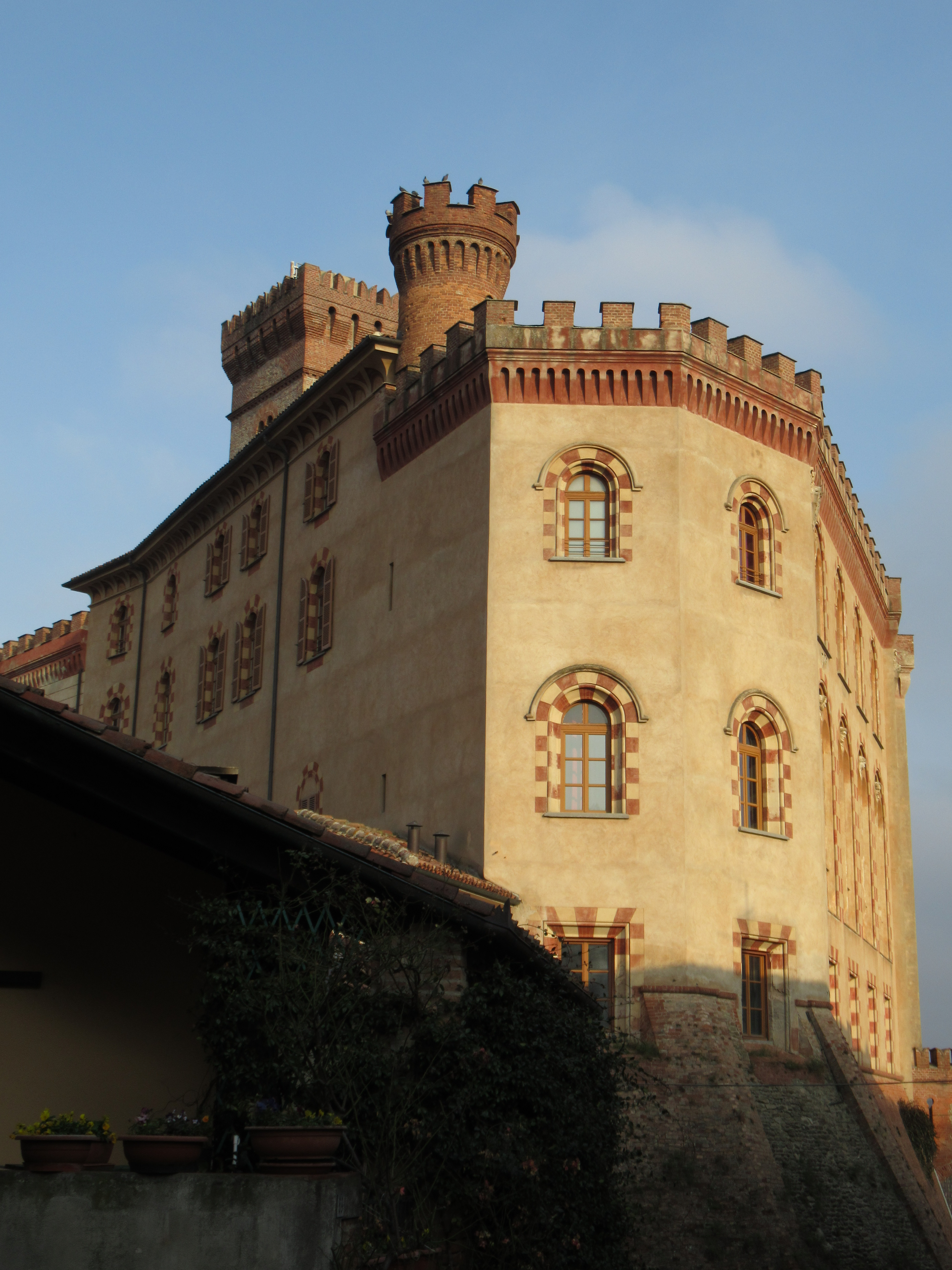
