= Piozzo =

- Comune
- Comune di Piozzo
- Location within Italy Location within Piedmont
- Coordinates: 44°31′N 7°54′E
- Country: Italy
- Region: Piedmont
- Province: Province of Cuneo (CN)

Government
  - Mayor: Adriano Bottero (Civic List)

Area
  - Total: 14.3 km^{2} (5.5 sq mi)

Population (1-1-2017)
  - Total: 998
  - Density: 69.8/km^{2} (181/sq mi)
- Time zone: UTC+1 (CET)
  - Summer (DST): UTC+2 (CEST)
- Postal code: 12060
- Dialing code: 0

Piozzo is a comune (municipality) in the Province of Cuneo in the Italian region Piedmont, located about 60 kilometres (37 mi) south of Turin and about 30 kilometres (19 mi) northeast of Cuneo. As of 1 January 2017, it had a population of 998 and an area of 14.3 square kilometres (5.5 mi^{2}).

Piozzo borders the following municipalities: Bene Vagienna, Carrù, Farigliano, and Lequio Tanaro.

== Demographic evolution ==
Historical population

Year	Pop.	±%
1861	1,581	—
1871	1,740	+10.1%
1881	1,860	+6.9%
1901	1,913	+2.8%
1911	1,913	+0.0%

Year	Pop.	±%
1921	1,698	−11.2%
1931	1,782	+4.9%
1936	1,685	−5.4%
1951	1,490	−11.6%
1961	1,251	−16.0%

Year	Pop.	±%
1971	992	−20.7%
1981	997	+0.5%
1991	956	−4.1%
2001	997	+4.3%

Source: Data from ISTAT
