= Somano =

- Comune
- Comune di Somano
- Location within Italy Location within Piedmont
- Coordinates: 44°32′N 8°0′E
- Country: Italy
- Region: Piedmont
- Province: Province of Cuneo (CN)
- Frazioni: Fossati, Altavilla, Sant'Antonio, Manzoni, Albere, Garombo, Curine, Peisino, Ruatalunga, Costalunga

Area
  - Total: 11.8 km^{2} (4.6 sq mi)
- Elevation: 516 m (1,693 ft)

Population (Dec. 2004)
  - Total: 399
  - Density: 33.8/km^{2} (87.6/sq mi)
- Demonym: Somanesi
- Time zone: UTC+1 (CET)
  - Summer (DST): UTC+2 (CEST)
- Postal code: 12060
- Dialing code: 0173

Somano is a comune (municipality) in the Province of Cuneo in the Italian region Piedmont, located about 60 kilometres (37 mi) southeast of Turin and about 40 kilometres (25 mi) northeast of Cuneo. As of 31 December 2004, it had a population of 399 and an area of 11.8 square kilometres (4.6 mi^{2}).

The municipality of Somano contains the frazioni (subdivisions, mainly villages and hamlets) Fossati, Altavilla, Sant'Antonio, Manzoni, Albere, Garombo, Curine, Peisino, Ruatalunga, and Costalunga.

Somano borders the following municipalities: Bonvicino, Bossolasco, and Dogliani.

== Demographic evolution ==
Historical population

| Year | Pop. | ±% |
|---|---|---|
| 1861 | 959 | — |
| 1871 | 1,111 | +15.8% |
| 1881 | 1,126 | +1.4% |
| 1901 | 1,112 | −1.2% |
| 1911 | 1,060 | −4.7% |

| Year | Pop. | ±% |
|---|---|---|
| 1921 | 1,080 | +1.9% |
| 1931 | 1,019 | −5.6% |
| 1936 | 1,015 | −0.4% |
| 1951 | 875 | −13.8% |
| 1961 | 668 | −23.7% |

| Year | Pop. | ±% |
|---|---|---|
| 1971 | 567 | −15.1% |
| 1981 | 498 | −12.2% |
| 1991 | 426 | −14.5% |
| 2001 | 386 | −9.4% |

Source: Data from ISTAT
