= Farigliano =

- Comune
- Comune di Farigliano
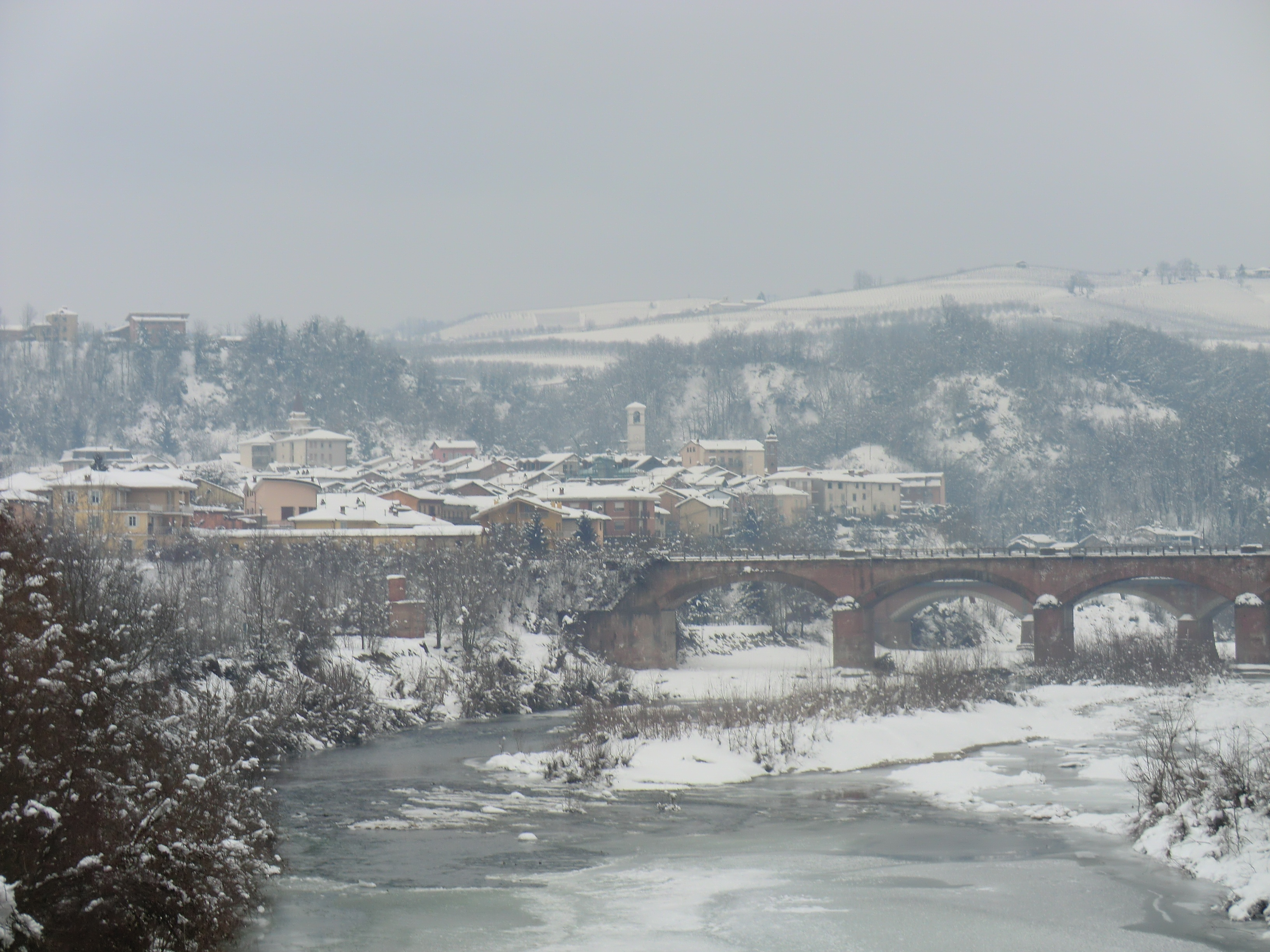

- Location within Italy Location within Piedmont
- Coordinates: 44°31′N 7°55′E
- Country: Italy
- Region: Piedmont
- Province: Province of Cuneo (CN)

Area
  - Total: 16.4 km^{2} (6.3 sq mi)

Population (Dec. 2004)
  - Total: 1,766
  - Density: 108/km^{2} (279/sq mi)
- Time zone: UTC+1 (CET)
  - Summer (DST): UTC+2 (CEST)
- Postal code: 12060
- Dialing code: 0173
- Website: Official website

Farigliano is a comune (municipality) in the Province of Cuneo in the Italian region Piedmont, located about 60 kilometres (37 mi) southeast of Turin and about 35 kilometres (22 mi) northeast of Cuneo. As of 31 December 2004, it had a population of 1,766 and an area of 16.4 square kilometres (6.3 mi^{2}).

Farigliano borders the following municipalities: Belvedere Langhe, Carrù, Clavesana, Dogliani, Lequio Tanaro, and Piozzo.

Farigliano is also the birthplace of Pietro Ferrero, Italian chocolatier and the founder of Ferrero SpA.

== Demographic evolution ==
Historical population

Year	Pop.	±%
1861	2,047	—
1871	2,322	+13.4%
1881	2,725	+17.4%
1901	3,134	+15.0%
1911	3,070	−2.0%

Year	Pop.	±%
1921	3,133	+2.1%
1931	2,691	−14.1%
1936	2,495	−7.3%
1951	2,332	−6.5%
1961	1,927	−17.4%

Year	Pop.	±%
1971	1,805	−6.3%
1981	1,810	+0.3%
1991	1,735	−4.1%
2001	1,752	+1.0%

Source: Data from ISTAT

== Twin towns ==
Farigliano is twinned with:

- Pianezze, Italy (1998)
