= Belvedere Langhe =

- Comune
- Comune di Belvedere Langhe
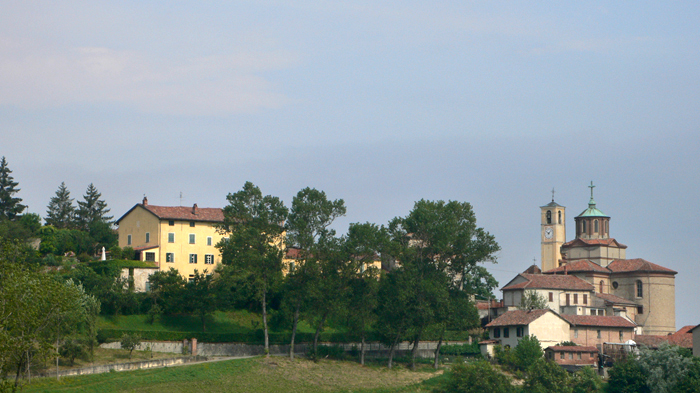
- Belvedere Langhe landscape

- Location within Italy Location within Piedmont
- Coordinates: 44°30′N 7°58′E
- Country: Italy
- Region: Piedmont
- Province: Province of Cuneo (CN)

Area
  - Total: 5.0 km^{2} (1.9 sq mi)

Population (Dec. 2004)
  - Total: 384
  - Density: 77/km^{2} (200/sq mi)
- Time zone: UTC+1 (CET)
  - Summer (DST): UTC+2 (CEST)
- Postal code: 12060
- Dialing code: 0173

Belvedere Langhe is a comune (municipality) in the Province of Cuneo in the Italian region Piedmont, located about 70 kilometres (43 mi) southeast of Turin and about 35 kilometres (22 mi) northeast of Cuneo. As of 31 December 2004, it had a population of 384 and an area of 5.0 square kilometres (1.9 mi^{2}).

Belvedere Langhe borders the following municipalities: Bonvicino, Clavesana, Dogliani, Farigliano, and Murazzano.

== Demographic evolution ==
Historical population

Year	Pop.	±%
1861	679	—
1871	618	−9.0%
1881	575	−7.0%
1901	635	+10.4%
1911	627	−1.3%

Year	Pop.	±%
1921	705	+12.4%
1931	633	−10.2%
1936	620	−2.1%
1951	528	−14.8%
1961	401	−24.1%

Year	Pop.	±%
1971	371	−7.5%
1981	358	−3.5%
1991	358	+0.0%
2001	372	+3.9%

Source: Data from ISTAT
