= Monchiero =

- Comune
- Comune di Monchiero
- Coat of arms

- Location within Italy Location within Piedmont
- Coordinates: 44°34′N 7°55′E
- Country: Italy
- Region: Piedmont
- Province: Province of Cuneo (CN)

Area
  - Total: 5.0 km^{2} (1.9 sq mi)

Population (Dec. 2004)
  - Total: 560
  - Density: 110/km^{2} (290/sq mi)
- Time zone: UTC+1 (CET)
  - Summer (DST): UTC+2 (CEST)
- Postal code: 12060
- Dialing code: 0173

Monchiero is a comune (municipality) in the Province of Cuneo in the Italian region Piedmont, located about 59 kilometres (37 mi) southeast of Turin and about 35 kilometres (22 mi) northeast of Cuneo. As of 31 December 2004, it had a population of 560 and an area of 5.0 square kilometres (1.9 mi^{2}).

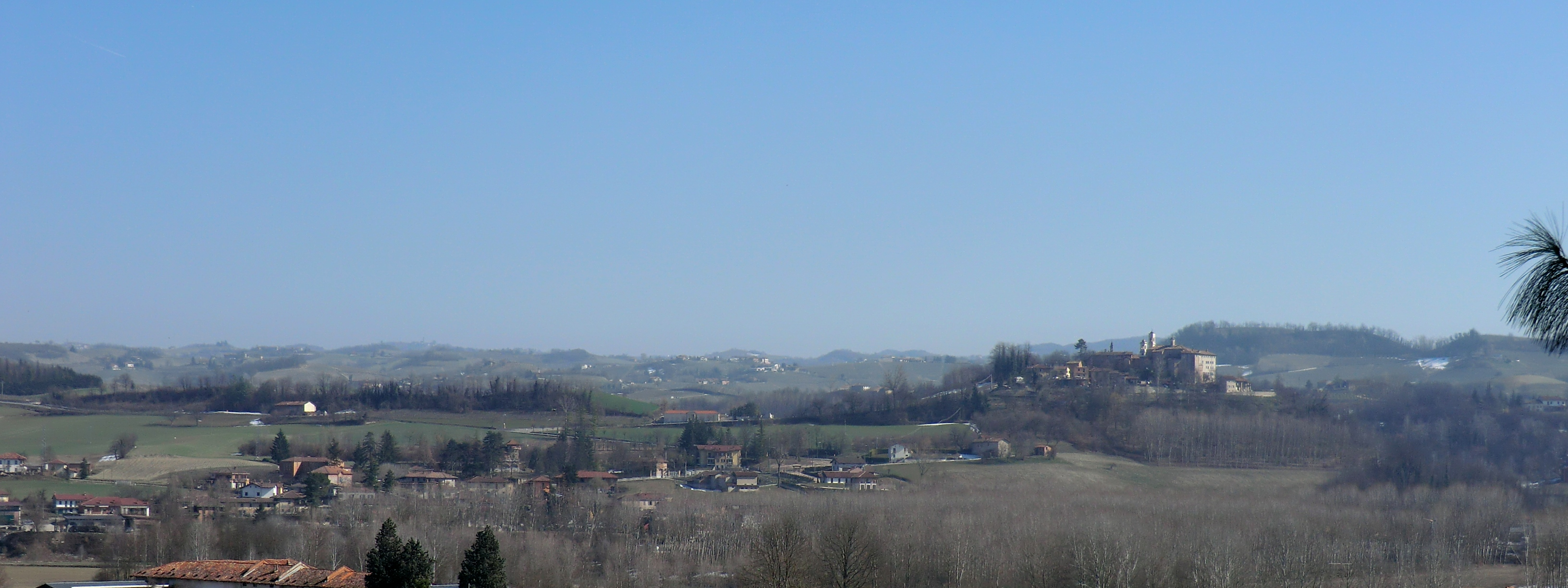
Monchiero panorama, 2 March 2012

Monchiero borders the following municipalities: Dogliani, Lequio Tanaro, Monforte d'Alba, and Novello.

== Demographic evolution ==
Historical population

Year	Pop.	±%
1861	446	—
1871	477	+7.0%
1881	618	+29.6%
1901	652	+5.5%
1911	699	+7.2%

Year	Pop.	±%
1921	640	−8.4%
1931	673	+5.2%
1936	722	+7.3%
1951	656	−9.1%
1961	563	−14.2%

Year	Pop.	±%
1971	553	−1.8%
1981	514	−7.1%
1991	474	−7.8%
2001	518	+9.3%

Source: Data from ISTAT
