= Novello, Piedmont =

Novello
- Comune
- Comune di Novello
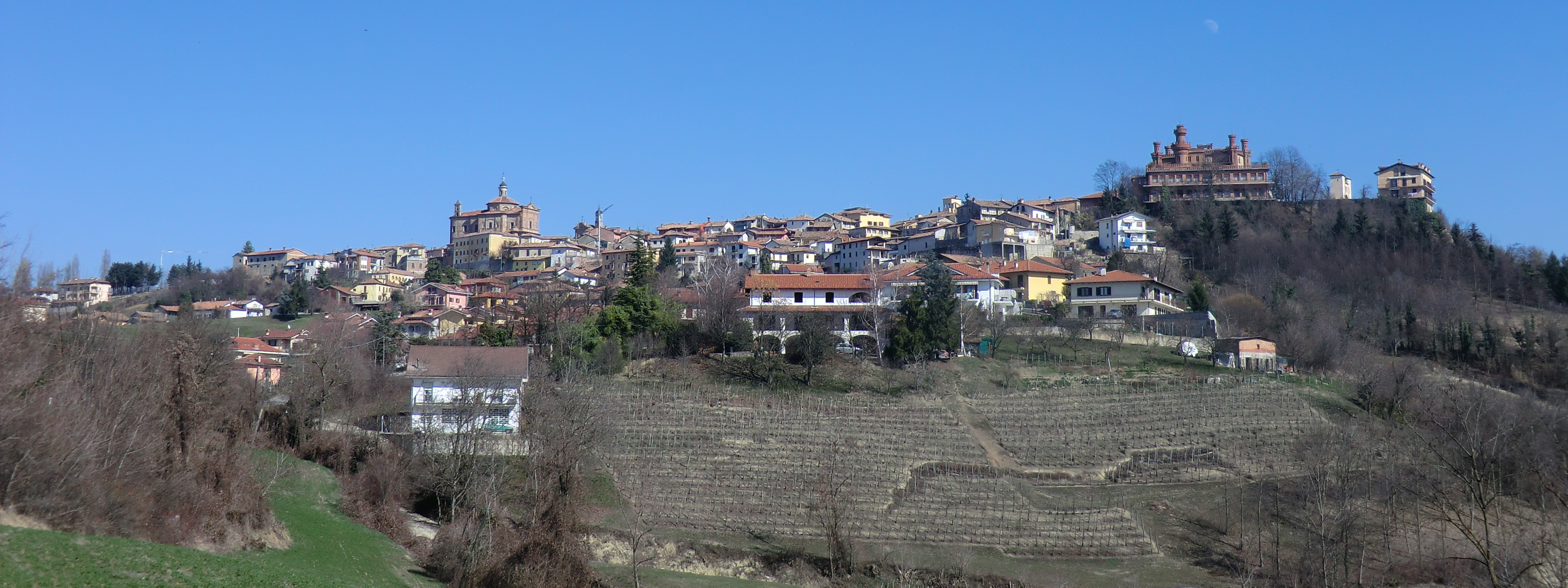

- Location within Italy Location within Piedmont
- Coordinates: 44°35′N 7°56′E
- Country: Italy
- Region: Piedmont
- Province: Province of Cuneo (CN)

Area
  - Total: 11.6 km^{2} (4.5 sq mi)

Population (Dec. 2004)
  - Total: 968
  - Density: 83.4/km^{2} (216/sq mi)
- Time zone: UTC+1 (CET)
  - Summer (DST): UTC+2 (CEST)
- Postal code: 12060
- Dialing code: 0173

Novello is a comune (municipality) in the Province of Cuneo in the Italian region of Piedmont. It is located approximately 60 kilometres (37 mi) southeast of Turin and 40 kilometres (25 mi) northeast of Cuneo. As of 31 December 2004, it had a population of 968 and covered an area of 11.6 square kilometres (4.5 mi^{2}). Novello shares borders with the following municipalities: Barolo, Lequio Tanaro, Monchiero, Monforte d'Alba, and Narzole.

== International relations ==
Novello is twinned with:

- Kristinestad, Finland
