= Bruno Giacosa =

Italian wine producer (died 2018)

Coordinates: 44.7219035°N 8.1170588°E

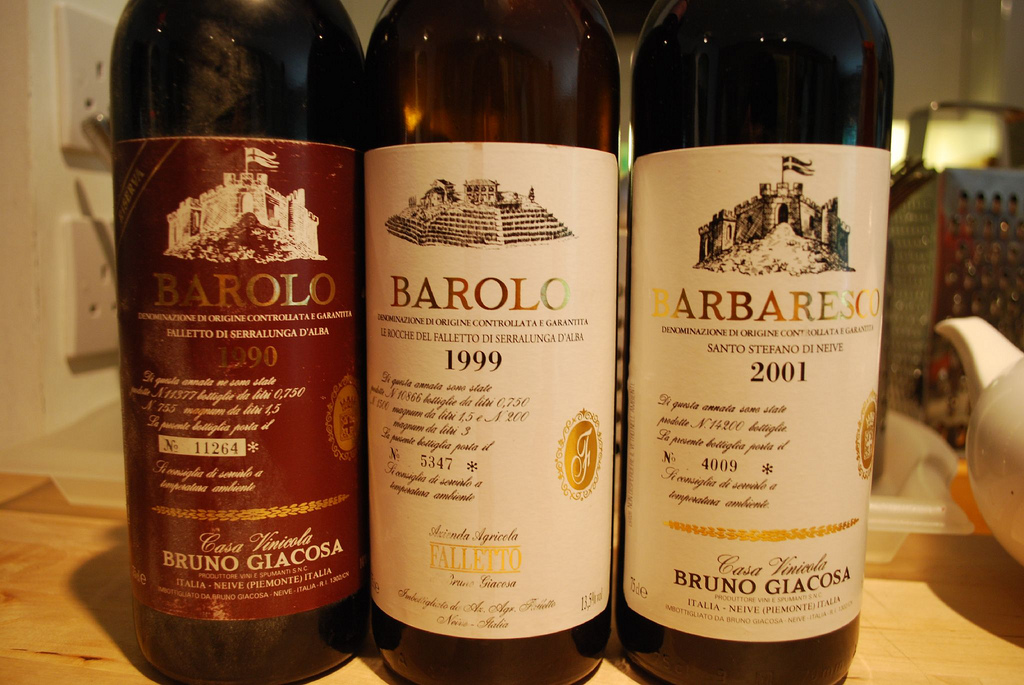
Three bottles from Bruno Giacosa: a 1990 Barolo Falletto Riserva, a 1999 Barolo Le Rocche del Falletto and 2001 Barbaresco Santo Stefano di Neive.

Bruno Giacosa (died 21 January 2018) was an Italian wine producer from the village Neive in the Langhe region (Piemonte), who produced a number of Barbaresco and Barolo wines, as well as bottlings of Arneis, Barbera, Dolcetto and a sparkling wine. Wines produced from owned vineyards are bottled under the label Azienda Agricola Falletto (di Bruno Giacosa), wines from bought grapes or from grapes from leased vineyards under the label Casa Vinicola Bruno Giacosa. In terms of the production of Nebbiolo, Giacosa was considered a traditionalist. He has been described as the "Genius of Neive".

== History ==
Initially in the tradition of commerciante, Carlo Giacosa and his son Mario Giacosa preceded the third-generation Bruno Giacosa (b. 1929), who began working in the family business from the age of 15, having left school during World War II, and began to learn their craft.

Making wine only from purchased fruit from select vineyards, Giacosa worked to obtain what he deemed the best grapes available from an established network of growers dedicated to producing quality. During the 1960s Giacosa was considered one of the three significant wine producers of Barbaresco, along with Gaja and Produttori del Barbaresco, who demonstrated "the full potential of [Barbaresco]".

The Giacosa bottlings of Arneis also attracted attention during the 1970s as one of only two producers making it, along with Vietti, and helped bring the grape back from near extinction.

Over decades, Giacosa's reputation for perfectionism became continuously reaffirmed, and the wines "stylistically consistent and painstakingly crafted". Known for his exacting standards, Giacosa will not bottle any wine if the vintage does not meet his scrutinous quality standards, and the vintage will be sold off in bulk as wine that is termed sfuso. Decanter estimates Bruno Giacosa among Italy's First Growths. The winery decided in 2013 that it would not be bottling its top reds from the 2010 vintage.

From 1990, Giacosa worked with the oenologist Dante Scaglione, who remained with the firm for 16 years. In 2008, the oenologist Giorgio Lavagna was employed as the successor. In May 2011, Dante Scaglione communicated his return as oenologist to Giacosa's winery.

Bruno Giacosa suffered a stroke in January 2006, which left him unable to work at the winery, though he made a full recovery. Gradually, Giacosa's daughter Bruna Giacosa has taken over an increased leadership role of the firm.

In recognition of his achievements, the University of Gastronomic Sciences of Bra in Piedmont gave Bruno Giacosa an honorary degree in 2012.

== Production ==
The Bruno Giacosa estate today encompasses 20 hectares (49 acres) of vineyards, producing about 400,000 bottles per year. In infrequent vintages that are deemed exceptional, a Riserva is produced, which is given a red label.

Vineyards lie in Asili and Rabajà in the Barbaresco zone, in La Morra and Serralunga. Barbaresco Santo Stefano, which became famous after Bruno began bottling it from the 1964 vintage, was produced from grapes grown by Italo Stupino at Castello di Neive. As of the 2012 vintage, the wine will no longer be bottled by Bruno Giacosa, as the firm moves towards an estate-only strategy for its top wines.

The oenological philosophy has been described as "updated traditional". Maceration on skins may last up to thirty days, though not past fifty as in extreme traditional practices. Botti (traditional 50hL casks) are used for aging, but in French oak rather than Slavonian.

=== Azienda Agricola Falletto ===
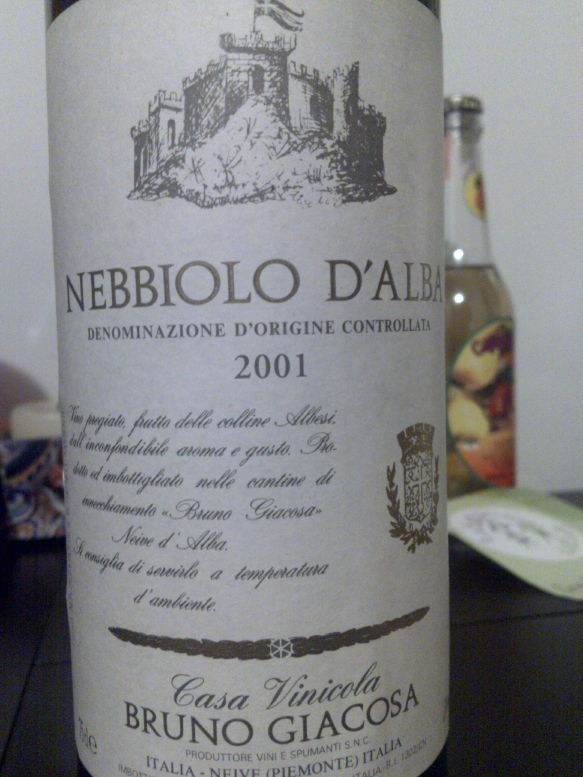
A bottle of 2001 Bruno Giacosa Nebbiolo d'Alba.

The range of wines from vineyards owned by Bruno Giacosa.

- Barbaresco DOCG Asili
  Barolo DOCG Falletto
  Barolo DOCG Le Rocche del Falletto
  Barolo DOCG Vigna Croera
  Barbera d’Alba DOC Falletto
  Dolcetto d’Alba DOC Falletto

=== Casa Vinicola Bruno Giacosa ===
The range of wines sourced from the vineyards of growers that are Giacosa's traditional collaborators.

- Barbaresco DOCG Santo Stefano di Neive
  Nebbiolo d’Alba DOC
  Nebbiolo d’Alba DOC Valmaggiore
  Dolcetto d’Alba DOC
  Dolcetto d’Alba DOC Basarini
  Roero Arneis DOCG
  Classic Method "Spumante" Extra Brut
