= Michele Marziani =

Italian writer

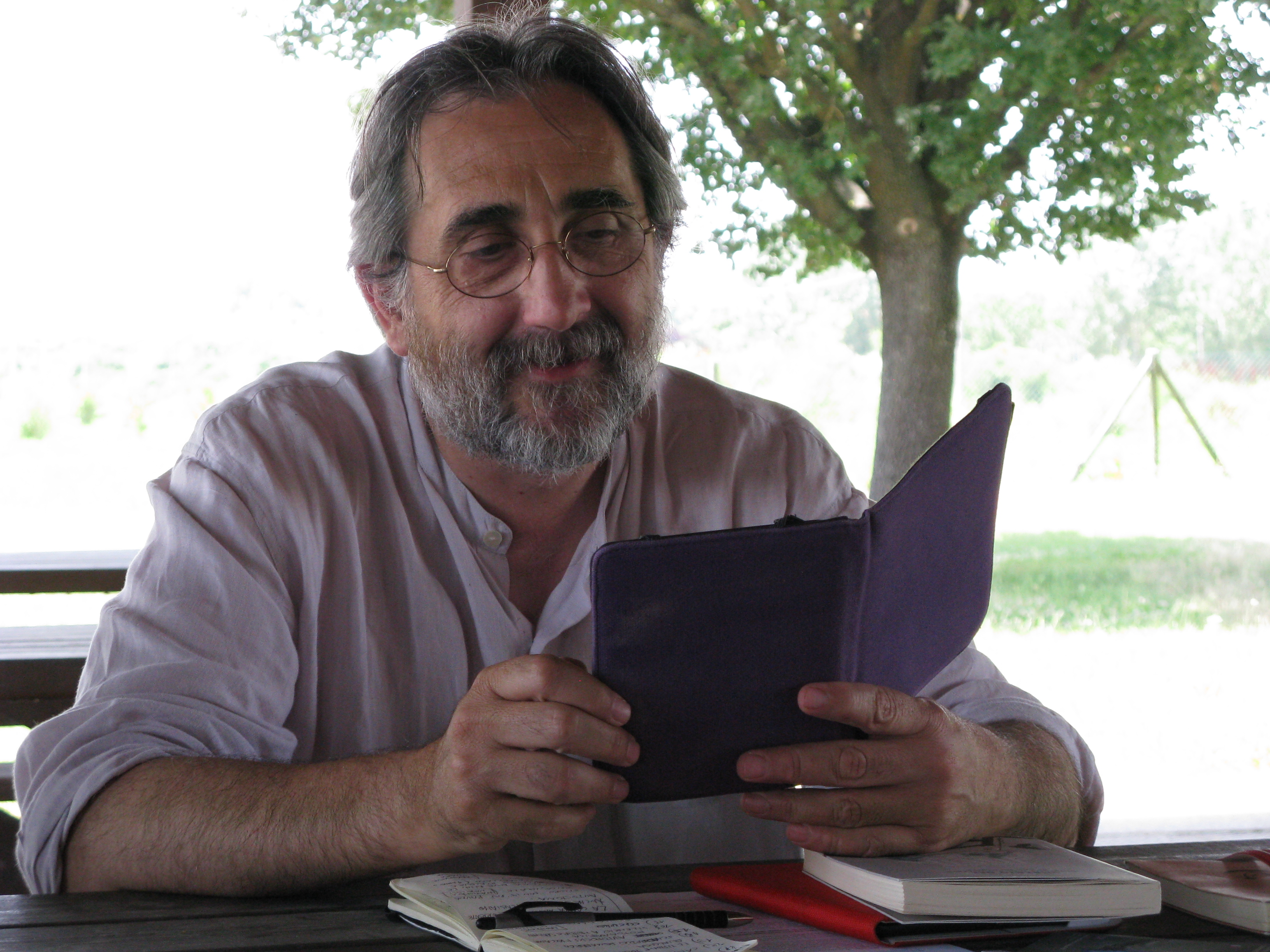
Michele Marziani in Argenta during the Giro d'Italia in 80 bookstores

Michele Marziani (born 16 May 1962) is an Italian novelist and journalist.

== Biography ==
After working for twenty years as a journalist committed to social matters, environment, enhancement of territories and Italian wine and food culture, Michele quit all his journalistic collaborations. Ending his journalistic pursuits in 2007 in favor of devoting himself mainly to works of fiction, although he went on publishing travel essays and practical manuals as well. In 2006 he published his first novel “La trota ai tempi di Zorro” (The trout in Zorro’s times) where he describes the years of terrorism, the so-called “lead years” through the naïve and curious eyes of a child who finds in trout fishing the key to the understanding the world, a chance for knowing and a redemption from cynic attitudes about life. Then the novels “Umberto Dei, biografia non autorizzata di una bicicletta”(Umberto Dei, unauthorized biography of a bicycle) (2008), the story of a finance broker who decides to quit a well paid job to make a living as a bicycle mechanic, his shop in Milan becomes a crossroads for meetings, loves, thoughts and adventures. “La signora del caviale”(The lady of the caviar) (2009) set in a community of sturgeon fishermen downstream the Po river during World War II. “Barafonda”(Deephollow) (2011) a hard and uncomfortable story but poetic and ironic telling little and big troubles of our times and the story collection “Un ombrello per le anguille”(An umbrella for the eels) (2012) where the eels, as words could do, tell about fishing, life, memories, impressions and feelings about the dawn and nostalgic sunsets. Marziani lives in Rimini but he spent several years by Lake Orta and in Milan. In 2017, his novel, "La signora del caviale" was republished in a new edition by Italian publisher Antonio Tombolini Editore for the book series, Officina Marziani. In January 2018, La signora del caviale becomes Michele's first translated novel with the title, "The Caviar Lady." The translation was curated by Anna Carruthers while both book covers (for the Italian and the English edition) were created by Marta D'Asaro.

== Awards ==
- 2005 The photographic book “ Black crayfish– recipes from jail” (DeriveApprodi, Roma, 2005) in collaboration with the photographer Davide Dutto wins the X issue of the National Award “ Books to taste” by La Morra (Cuneo)
- 2010 “ The flavours of Middle Earth” wins the section for historical essay writing of The National Literary Prize Tracks of Country.
- 2010 The novel “The lady of the caviar” ranks second place at the International Journalistic Award “ The Chambers of Commerce and Ferrara Province for Food and Farming”.
- 2011 “Taste subversives – vol. II” in collaboration with the photographer Marco Salzotto, wins the Gourmand Best in the World 2010 for photography.

== Works ==
=== Novels ===
- 2006 La trota ai tempi di Zorro (The trout in Zorro’s time), Roma, DeriveApprodi
- 2008 Umberto Dei, biografia non autorizzata di una bicicletta (Umberto Dei unauthorized biography of a bicycle) Firenze, Cult (2014, Portogruaro, Ediciclo)
- 2009 La signora del caviale(The Lady of the Caviar), Firenze, Cult
- 2011 Barafonda (Deephollow), Firenze, Barbes
- 2013 Nel nome di Marco (In the Name of Marco), Portogruaro, Ediciclo
- 2014 Fotogrammi in 6x6 (6x6 Frames), Loreto, Antonio Tombolini Editore
- 2017 La figlia del partigiano O'Connor (The partisan O'Connor's daughter), Firenze, Clichy
- 2018 The Caviar Lady, Milano, Antonio Tombolini Editore
- 2020 Lo sciamano delle Alpi (The Shaman of the Alps), Udine, Bottega Errante Editore
- 2021 La cena dei coscritti (The Conscripts' Dinner), Udine, Bottega Errante Editore
- 2024 Dove dormi la notte. Una storia di Resistenza, pesca e socialismo (Where You Sleep at Night. A Story of Resistance, Fishing, and Socialism.), Gignese, MonteRosa Edizioni
- 2025 Il bandito (The Bandit), Udine, Bottega Errante Editore

=== Short stories collection ===
- 2012 Un ombrello per le anguille (An Umbrella for the Eels), Milano, Guido Tommasi

=== Essays ===
- 1997 I custodi delle acque-storia dell'Avpmo (The guardians of the waters – story of the Avpmo), Domodossola, Grossi
- 2005 La cucina riminese tra terra e mare(Cooking Rimini way between earth and sea) Rimini, Panozzo (with Piero Meldini)
- 2006 Tra tradizione e innovazione, guida enogastronomica della Toscana(Between tradition and innovation, guide to wine and food in Tuscany). Bergamo, Bolis Edition
- 2008 Lungo il Po. Viaggio controcorrente alla scoperta di sapori, genti e leggende del Grande Fiume. (Along the Po river. Upstream journey discovering tastes, peoples and legends of the Big River). Milano, Guido Tommasi
- 2010 I sapori della Terra di Mezzo. A due passi da Milano, tra Lomellina e la valle del Ticino (The flavour of the Middle Earth. A short walk from Milan, between Lomellina and Ticino Valley), Milano, Guido Tommasi
- 2012 Il paese dei ghiottoni. Montefeltro, Frusaglia il mare sulle orme di Fabio Tombari (The gluttons country. Montefeltro, Frusaglia, the Sea following the steps of Fabio Tombari), Milano, Guido Tommasi

=== Photography ===
- 2005 "Il gambero nero-ricette dal carcere”(Black crayfish–recipes from jail) Roma, DeriveApprodi (with Davide Dutto)
- 2006 Monsù Fotogallo, Savigliano, L'Artistica (with Davide Dutto)
- 2008 Ibleide, Uomini e Olio(Ibleide. Men and Oil), Fossano, Cibele (with Davide Dutto and Lorenzo Piccione di Pianogrillo)
- 2008 Sovversivi del gusto (Taste subversives), Rimini, Ndapress (with Marco Salzotto)
- 2009 Sovversivi del gusto - volume 2(Taste subversives – vol. 2), Rimini, Ndapress (with Marco Salzotto)
- 2010 La piadina filosofale (Philosopher’s piadina)., Fossano, Cibele (with Davide Dutto)

=== Wine and food works ===
- 1998 La piadina romagnola (Piadina from Romagna), Verucchio, Pazzini
- 2006 Sangiovese(Sangiovese wine), Rimini, Ndapress (with Roberta Sapio)

=== Manuals ===
- 1990 Pesca - 70 itinerari nelle Marche e Umbria(Fishing - 70 routes through Marche and Umbria), Milano, Giorgio Bernardini (with Marco Fabbri)
- 1991 Pesca - 70 itinerari in Toscana(Fishing - 70 routes in Tuscany), Milano, Giorgio Bernardini (with Marco Fabbri)
- 1991 Pesca - 65 itinerari in Emilia-Romagna (Fishing - 65 routes in Emilia-Romagna), Milano, Giorgio Bernardini (with Marco Fabbri)
- 1993 La pesca alla trota in Italia(Trout fishing in Italy), Firenze, Edai
- 1994 Il carpfishing in Italia (Carpfishing in Italy), Firenze, Edai (with Massimo Mantovani)
- 1995 A pesca in Ossola (To go fishing in Ossola valley), Domodossola, Grossi
