= Giacosa =

Giacosa, an Italian surname, may refer to:

- Colleretto Giacosa, municipality in the province of Turin
- Bruno Giacosa (died 2018), Italian Piemonte wine producer

== People ==
- Dante Giacosa (1905–1996), Italian car designer
- Giuseppe Giacosa (1847–1906), Italian poet
