= Sebastian Valfrè =

Blessed Sebastian Valfrè C.O.
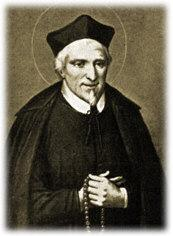
- Born: 9 March 1629; Verduno, Duchy of Savoy
- Died: 30 January 1710 (aged 80); Turin, Duchy of Savoy
- Venerated in: Roman Catholic Church
- Beatified: 15 July 1834, Rome by Pope Gregory XVI
- Major shrine: Oratory Church of Turin
- Feast: 30 January

Sebastian Valfrè (9 March 1629 – 30 January 1710) was a Catholic priest and a member of the Oratory of Saint Philip Neri. He is called the Apostle of Turin for his long years of service to the people of that city, where he served as the provost of the local Oratory for many years.

== Life ==
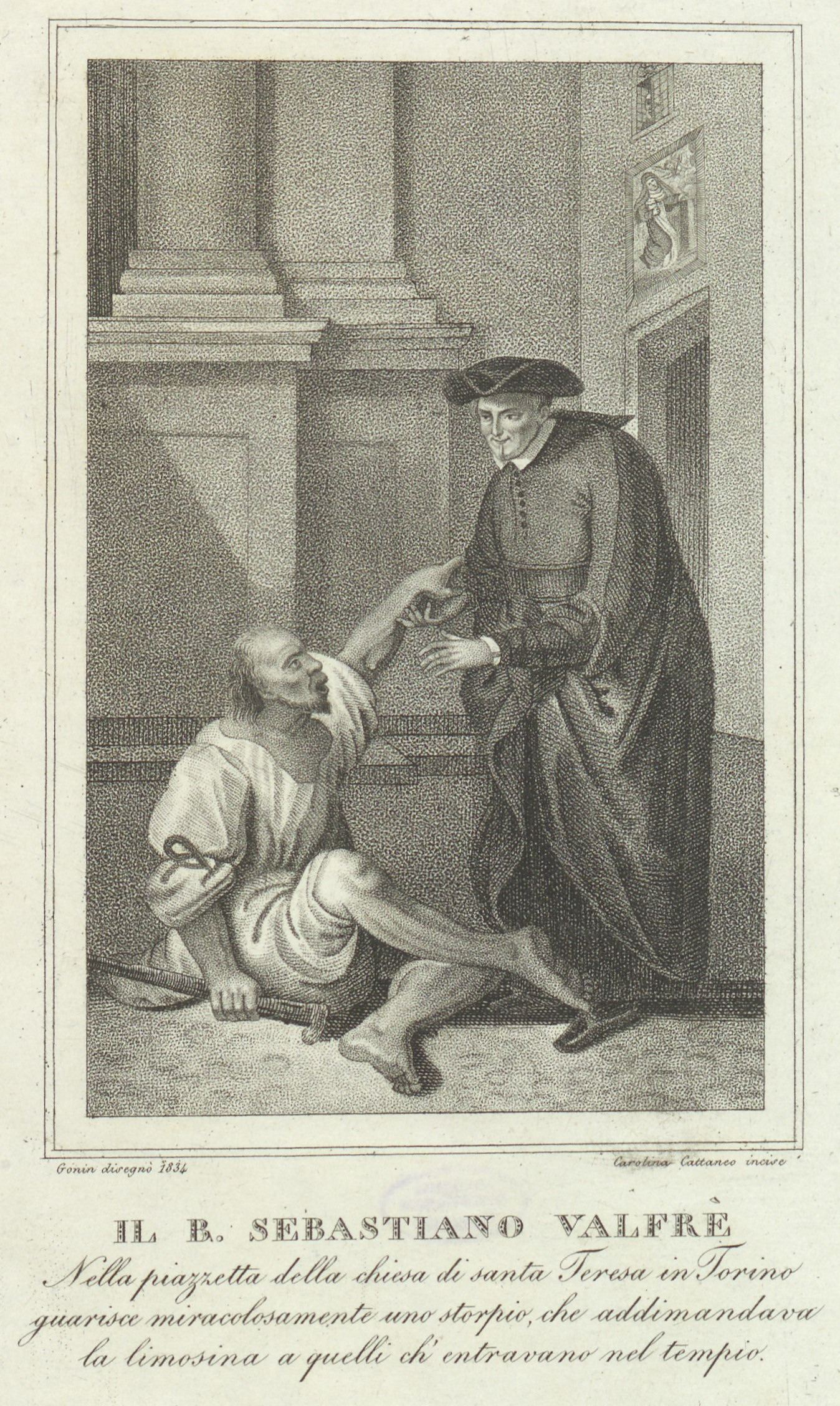
Sebastiano Valfrè heals a cripple. Lithograph, 1834-1835.

Valfrè was born in Verduno, then in the Duchy of Savoy, now in the Province of Cuneo in the Piedmont region of Italy. He was born to a family of poor farmers, but through struggle and effort he managed to attend various universities in the region, until he graduated from the University of Turin.

Valfrè joined the Oratory of Saint Philip Neri in Turin on 26 May 1651, the feast day of their founder, St. Philip Neri, and was ordained a priest on the following 24 February. He was awarded the degree of Doctor of Theology in 1656.

In his ministry to the people of Turin, Valfrè gained a reputation for caring for the sick and as a confessor with deep insight. He became the confessor for Duke Victor Amadeus II of the House of Savoy and many of the members of the royal court. He had a strong concern too, though, for the poor and needy of the kingdom, finding help for the widows and orphans and providing comfort to prisoners, whom he would visit. He eventually was offered the office of Archbishop of Turin, but declined the appointment.

Valfre is known for his service to the poor during the famine of 1678-80 and the 17-week siege of Turin during the war between Piemonte and Louis XIV. He is still invoked as patron of military chaplains for his ministry to soldiers during the war.

Valfrè had a great devotion to the Shroud of Turin, and he can be seen in an illustration from the period supervising some repair work done on it in 1694. He also had a concern for the religious education of the people, personally instructing many in the teachings of the Catholic faith as found in the Catechism of the Council of Trent. Additionally, out his devotion to the Blessed Mother, he inspired the duke to erect the Basilica of Superga.

Valfrè's interests and influence were not limited to the duchy. He helped to found the Pontifical Academy of Ecclesiastical Nobles in Rome in 1701, which was established to train diplomats for the Papal States. Under its current name of the Pontifical Ecclesiastical Academy, it still fulfills that function for the Vatican City State.

Valfrè died in Turin on 30 January 1710, and his remains are now preserved in a silver urn in the Oratory Church of Turin. He was beatified by Pope Gregory XVI on 15 July 1834, with his feast day celebrated by the Congregation of the Oratory on 30 January.
