= Vietti =

Vietti is a surname. Notable people with the surname include:

- Brandon Vietti, American television producer, director and animator
- Celestino Vietti, Italian motorcycle racer
- Eleanor Ardel Vietti, American physician and POW
- Josh Vietti, American violinist and composer
- Michele Vietti, Italian politician
- Teresa J. Vietti, American oncologist
