= Roddi =

- Comune
- Comune di Roddi
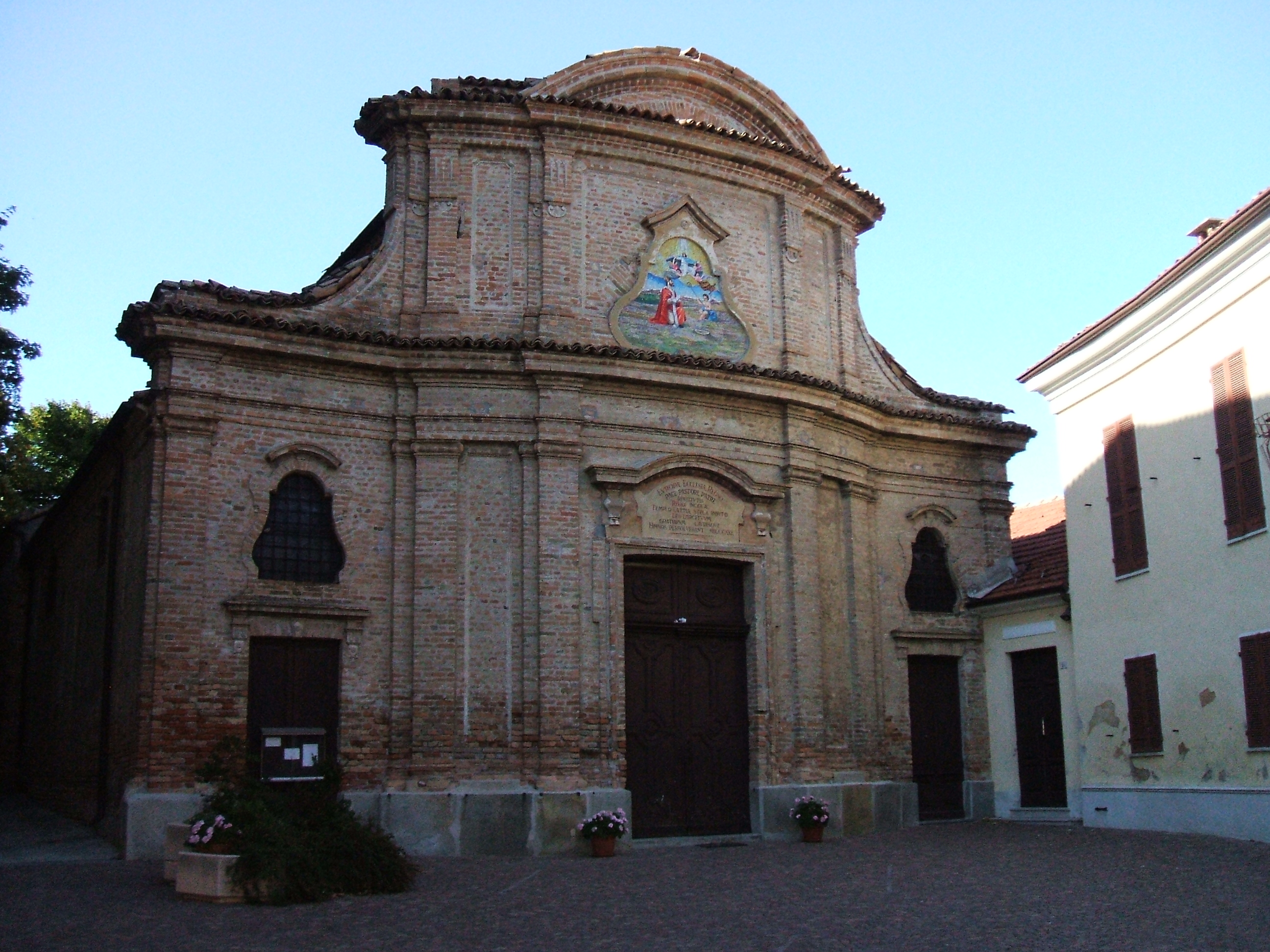
- Parish church of Santa Maria Assunta

- Location within Italy Location within Piedmont
- Coordinates: 44°41′N 7°58′E
- Country: Italy
- Region: Piedmont
- Province: Province of Cuneo (CN)

Area
  - Total: 9.4 km^{2} (3.6 sq mi)
- Elevation: 285 m (935 ft)

Population (Dec. 2004)
  - Total: 1,426
  - Density: 150/km^{2} (390/sq mi)
- Time zone: UTC+1 (CET)
  - Summer (DST): UTC+2 (CEST)
- Postal code: 12060
- Dialing code: 0173

Roddi is a comune (municipality) in the Province of Cuneo in the Italian region Piedmont, located about 50 kilometres (31 mi) southeast of Turin and about 45 kilometres (28 mi) northeast of Cuneo.

As of 31 December 2004, it had a population of 1,426 and an area of 9.4 square kilometres (3.6 mi^{2}).

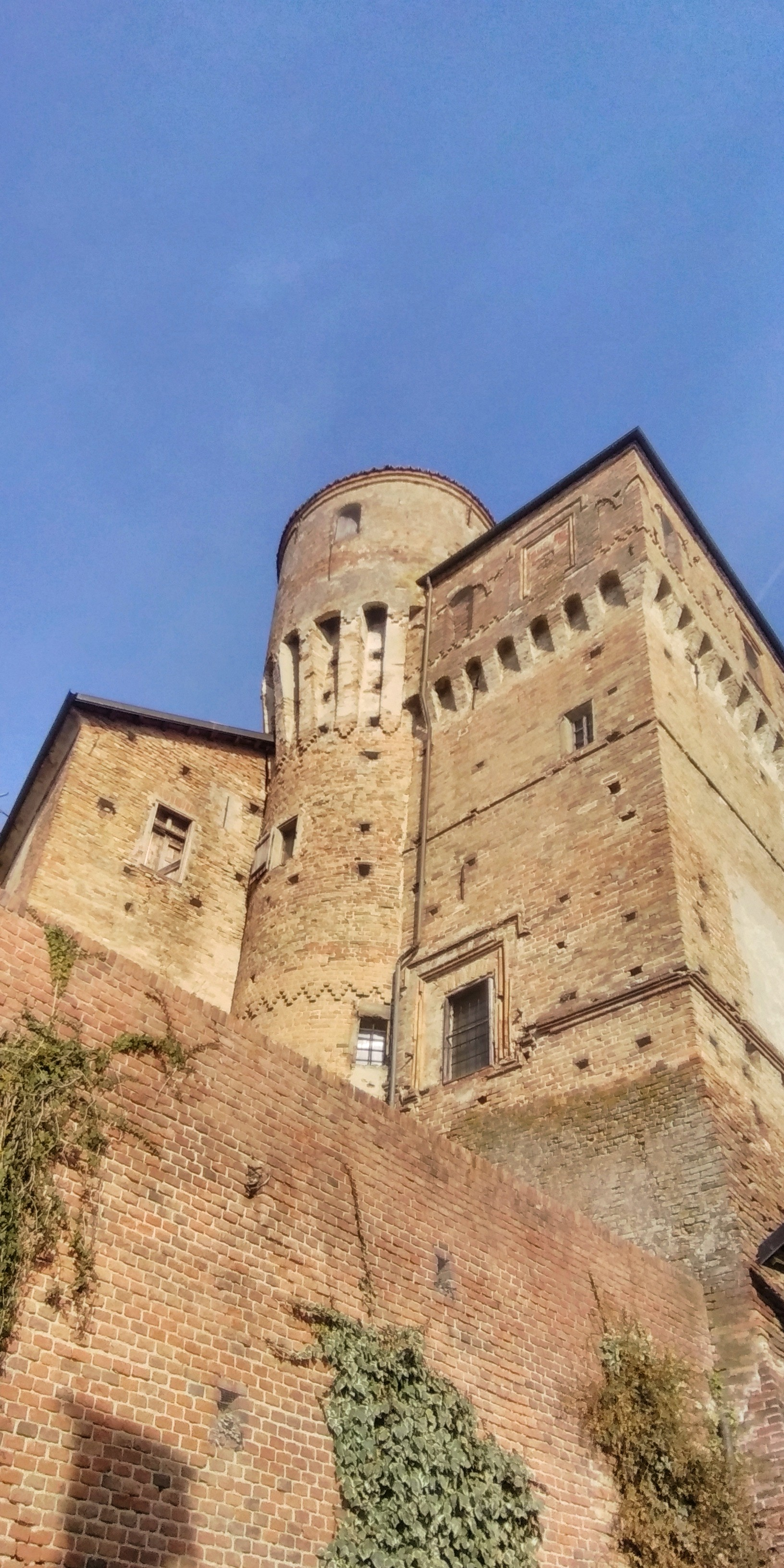
Roddi is best known for its medieval castle located in the centre of the comune

Roddi borders the following municipalities: Alba, La Morra, Monticello d'Alba, Santa Vittoria d'Alba, and Verduno.

== Demographic evolution ==
Historical population

| Year | Pop. | ±% |
|---|---|---|
| 1861 | 1,266 | — |
| 1871 | 1,314 | +3.8% |
| 1881 | 1,309 | −0.4% |
| 1901 | 1,411 | +7.8% |
| 1911 | 1,292 | −8.4% |

| Year | Pop. | ±% |
|---|---|---|
| 1921 | 1,346 | +4.2% |
| 1931 | 1,420 | +5.5% |
| 1936 | 1,341 | −5.6% |
| 1951 | 1,156 | −13.8% |
| 1961 | 917 | −20.7% |

| Year | Pop. | ±% |
|---|---|---|
| 1971 | 784 | −14.5% |
| 1981 | 843 | +7.5% |
| 1991 | 1,108 | +31.4% |
| 2001 | 1,323 | +19.4% |

Source: Data from ISTAT
