= Eleanor Ardel Vietti =

American physician and missionary

- Born: November 5, 1927; Fort Worth, Texas, US
- Disappeared: May 30, 1962 (aged 34); Vietnam
- Status: Missing for 63 years, 8 months and 29 days
- Occupations: physician, missionary
- Employer(s): Christian and Missionary Alliance (C&MA)

Eleanor Ardel Vietti (November 5, 1927 – disappeared May 30, 1962) was an American physician and missionary. She worked at the Buôn Ma Thuột leper colony where she was taken as a prisoner of war (POW) on May 30, 1962. She was America’s first woman POW in Vietnam. She is currently the only American woman unaccounted for from the Vietnam War.

== Biography ==
Vietti was born in Fort Worth, Texas and had a twin sister, Teresa J. Vietti and a younger brother, Victor. Vietti and her sister were both interested in science and medicine early on. The family lived in Bogota, Colombia until she was around fourteen. Vietti then contracted a bad strep infection and had surgery in Houston, Texas. Because of her illness, she became more religious, but also was a year behind her twin sister in school. Vietti attended San Jacinto High School (Houston, Texas). After graduation, Vietti attended Rice University and studied for a summer at Nyack Missionary College. Then she went to medical school at the University of Texas from 1950 to 1954. She interned at the South Shore Hospital in Chicago and then did a year's residency at the General Hospital of Wichita Falls, finishing in 1956.

Vietti entered missionary work around 1957 and the next year, went to South Vietnam. She worked in Buôn Ma Thuột at a Christian and Missionary Alliance leper colony. There was a high rate of leprosy among the Montagnard people and Vietti both treated those with leprosy and worked to prevent the disease. She made house calls to people in the villages. In 1961, her sister Teresa visited the leper colony.

== Disappearance ==
In April 1962, Vietti came back to the United States and visited with her family in Houston and St. Louis. She also took a course in cleft-palate repair in St. Louis. Her family wanted her to stay in the United States. The Department of State also warned Vietti about returning to the leper colony. However, Vietti chose to return to Vietnam.

On May 30, 1962, Vietti, Archie E. Mitchell and Daniel A. Gerber were kidnapped by 12 Viet Cong guerillas. Vietti's ankle was injured, so it was reported that she was not tied up by the soldiers and was limping. Vietti, Mitchell and Gerber were taken to the nurses' house, where the Viet Cong members lectured them, and also promised that Dr. Vietti would not be harmed. The three captives were taken away by car. The other nine Americans in the leper colony were left behind. It was suspected that she was taken in order to work in a Viet Cong hospital. A captured Viet Cong soldier told interrogators later in 1962 that Vietti was treating the Viet Cong wounded.

It was believed that she was being moved from village to village and was still believed alive in 1965. A report of a white woman asking for a Bible in a village came through in 1967. In 1968, the Christian and Missionary Alliance announced at their General Council that Vietti and the other 2 missionaries captured were still alive. Reports of seeing Vietti and the other two missionaries among the Montagnard villages continued into the 1970s. However, by 1991, she was listed as "presumed dead" on the Prisoner of War/Missing in Action list.

== Legacy ==
In 1998, Maggie O'Kane reported about Vietti and her capture on a radio special called The Only Woman Left Behind. In the show, she discussed Vietti's capture, aired memories of families and friends and speculated on what had happened to Vietti. In 2008, Nyack College honored her and other alumni who were lost in Vietnam, adding their names to a special stone bench on campus.

== See also ==
- Archie E. Mitchell
- List of people who disappeared mysteriously: 1910–1990
