= Teresa J. Vietti =

American physician active in pediatric cancer research

Teresa J. Vietti (November 5, 1927 – January 25, 2010) was an American physician. She is best known for her pioneering work and research in pediatric cancer. Her research discovered the genetics of leukemia, new chemotherapy agents and tracked the effects of chemotherapy on childhood cancer survivors. Vietti also wrote about her research and was an editor of the Journal of Pediatric Hematology and a co-editor of Clinical Pediatric Oncology. According to Washington University in St. Louis, she was known as "the mother of pediatric cancer therapy."

== Biography ==
Vietti was born in Fort Worth, Texas, and had a twin sister, Eleanor Ardel Vietti and a younger brother, Victor. Both she and her twin sister were interested in science and medicine as young girls. She and her family lived in Bogota, Colombia until Ardel Vietti became sick and they all moved to Houston, Texas, where Ardel was treated.

Vietti went to Rice University when she was seventeen and graduated in 1949. She then went on to Baylor College of Medicine for her medical degree, graduating in 1953. She did her residency and internship at St. Louis Children's Hospital. Vietti went to Wayne University College of Medicine in 1958 for specialist training in hematology. In 1961, she worked for six months as a visiting pediatrician at the Hacettepe Children's Hospital in Ankara. Also in 1961, she visited her sister in Vietnam at the leprosarium where Ardel worked. Vietti became an assistant professor of pediatrics at Washington University School of Medicine also in 1961.

In 1962, she received word that her sister, Ardel Vietti was kidnapped and was being held a prisoner of the Viet Cong. Vietti would never see her sister again, but she did talk about her for the 1998 radio program, The Only Woman Left Behind.

In 1962 and 1963, she was a principal investigator in a Washington University study on the effects of lead intoxication in children. In 1970, Vietti received a grant from the St. Louis Leukemia Guild to study treatments for leukemia. In 1972, Vietti became a full professor at Washington University. In 1975, she received a large grant from the National Cancer Institute to study cancer in children. Her research uncovered the genetic basis of leukemia, new chemotherapy agents and also studied the long-term effects of chemotherapy on childhood cancer survivors. Vietti retired in 1998.

She published more than 200 peer-reviewed articles and was known to remove her name from some studies so that younger researchers would get greater exposure for their work. Vietti co-authored Clinical Pediatric Oncology (1973) which has four editions and according to Washington University is "one of the premier texts in its field." She was an editor of the Journal of Pediatric Hematology and a co-editor of Clinical Pediatric Oncology.

In 1976, Vietti earned the UNICO Award. She was awarded the Lifetime Achievement Award from the American Society for Pediatric Hematology-Oncology in 1994. The Leukemia Society of America presented her with their Return of the Child Award in 1999. Washington University awarded her the Second Century Award in 2007.

Vietti died on January 25, 2010, at the Missouri Baptist Medical Center in Town and Country of natural causes; her health had been deteriorating for the previous few months. In 2013, Washington University created 3 pediatric scholar positions, one of which was named after Vietti.
