= Verduno =

- Comune
- Comune di Verduno
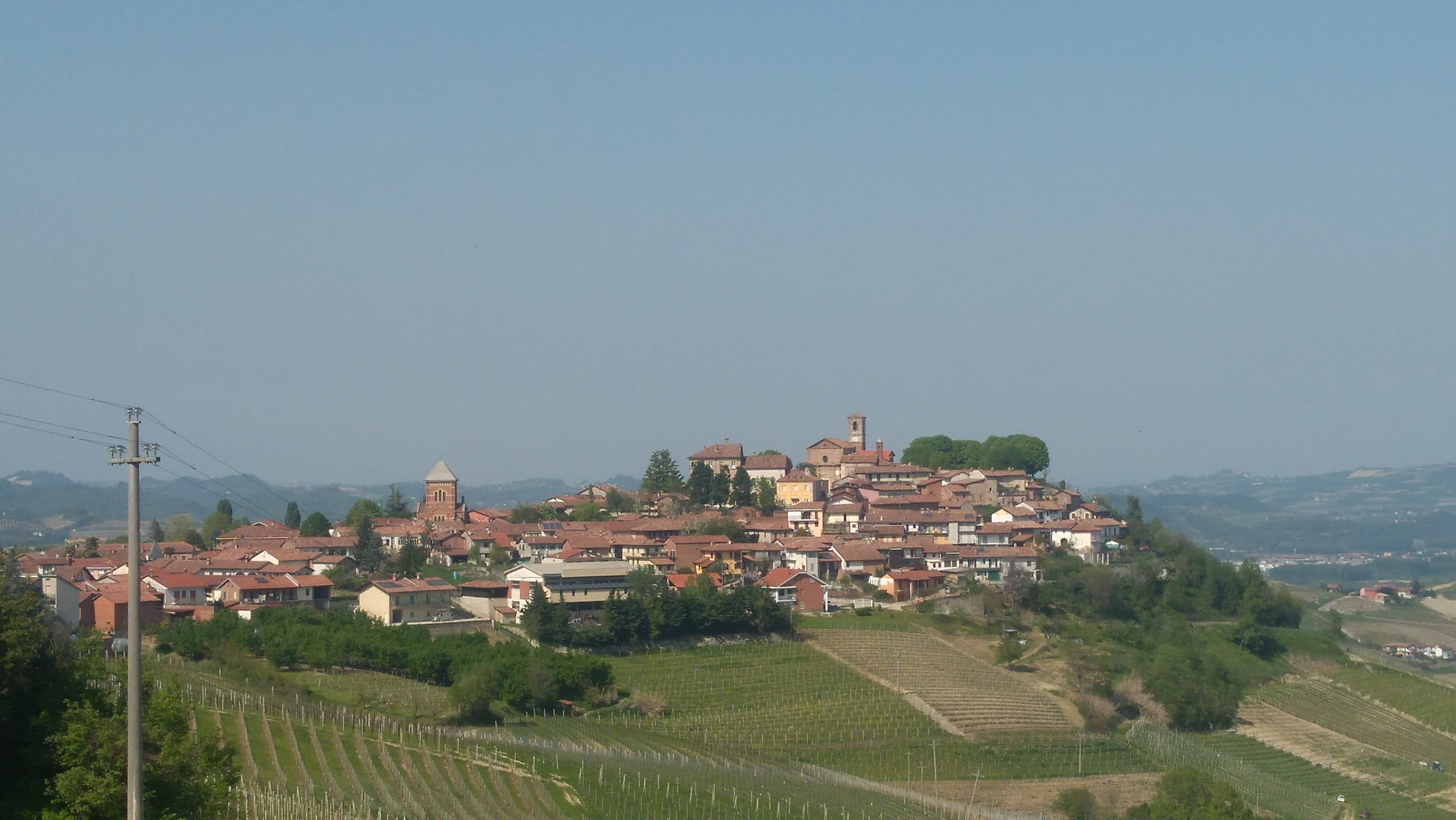

- Coat of arms

- Location within Italy Location within Piedmont
- Coordinates: 44°40′N 7°56′E
- Country: Italy
- Region: Piedmont
- Province: Province of Cuneo (CN)

Area
  - Total: 7.3 km^{2} (2.8 sq mi)

Population (Dec. 2004)
  - Total: 523
  - Density: 72/km^{2} (190/sq mi)
- Time zone: UTC+1 (CET)
  - Summer (DST): UTC+2 (CEST)
- Postal code: 12060
- Dialing code: 0172

Verduno is a comune (municipality) in the Province of Cuneo in the Italian region Piedmont, located about 50 kilometres (31 mi) southeast of Turin and about 45 kilometres (28 mi) northeast of Cuneo. As of 31 December 2004, it had a population of 523 and an area of 7.3 square kilometres (2.8 mi^{2}).

Verduno borders the following municipalities: Bra, La Morra, Roddi, and Santa Vittoria d'Alba.

== Demographic evolution ==
Historical population

Year	Pop.	±%
1861	709	—
1871	697	−1.7%
1881	770	+10.5%
1901	771	+0.1%
1911	741	−3.9%

Year	Pop.	±%
1921	771	+4.0%
1931	782	+1.4%
1936	755	−3.5%
1951	627	−17.0%
1961	501	−20.1%

Year	Pop.	±%
1971	465	−7.2%
1981	433	−6.9%
1991	430	−0.7%
2001	512	+19.1%

Source: Data from ISTAT
