= La Morra =

- Comune
- Comune di La Morra
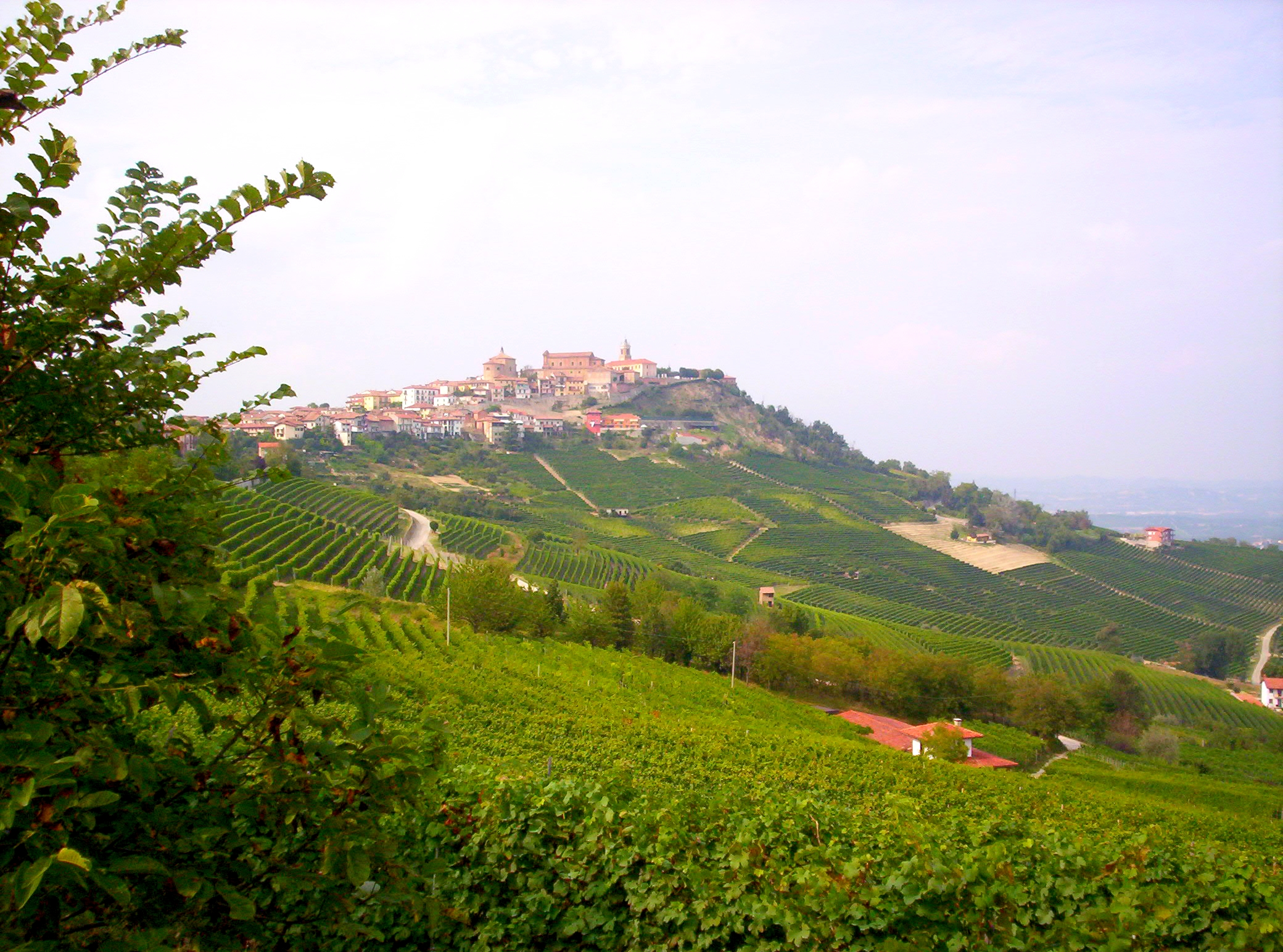

- Location within Italy Location within Piedmont
- Coordinates: 44°38′N 7°56′E
- Country: Italy
- Region: Piedmont
- Province: Cuneo (CN)
- Frazioni: Annunziata, Santa Maria, Rivalta, Berri

Government
  - Mayor: Marialuisa Ascheri

Area
  - Total: 24.3 km^{2} (9.4 sq mi)
- Elevation: 513 m (1,683 ft)

Population (31 December 2010)
  - Total: 2,758
  - Density: 113/km^{2} (294/sq mi)
- Demonym: Lamorresi
- Time zone: UTC+1 (CET)
  - Summer (DST): UTC+2 (CEST)
- Postal code: 12064
- Dialing code: 0173
- Website: Official website

La Morra is a comune (municipality) in the Province of Cuneo in the Italian region Piedmont, located about 50 kilometres (31 mi) southeast of Turin and about 40 kilometres (25 mi) northeast of Cuneo. As of 31 December 2004, it had a population of 2,668 and an area of 24.3 square kilometres (9.4 mi^{2}).

The municipality of La Morra contains the frazioni (subdivisions, mainly villages and hamlets) Annunziata, Santa Maria, Rivalta, and Berri.

La Morra borders the following municipalities: Alba, Barolo, Bra, Castiglione Falletto, Cherasco, Narzole, Roddi, and Verduno.

== History ==
La Morra originated as Murra (Latin: "sheep fencing"), a village built in the Roman era by the nearby town of Alba Pompeia. In 1631 it became a possession of the House of Savoy.

Long a major wine growing region, it was illegal in La Morra to cut down a Nebbiolo vine. The penalties for this offense ranged from a fine, to having a hand amputated to hanging.

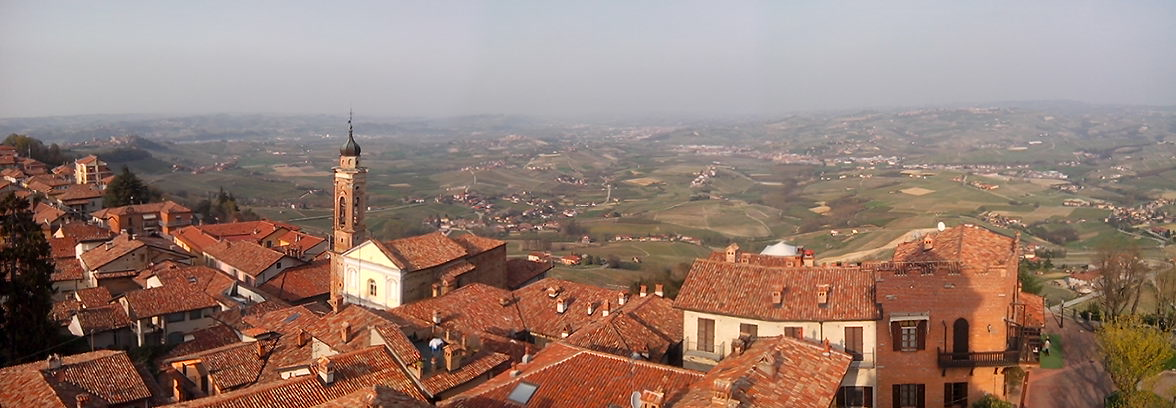
Panoramic view of La Morra from the bell tower

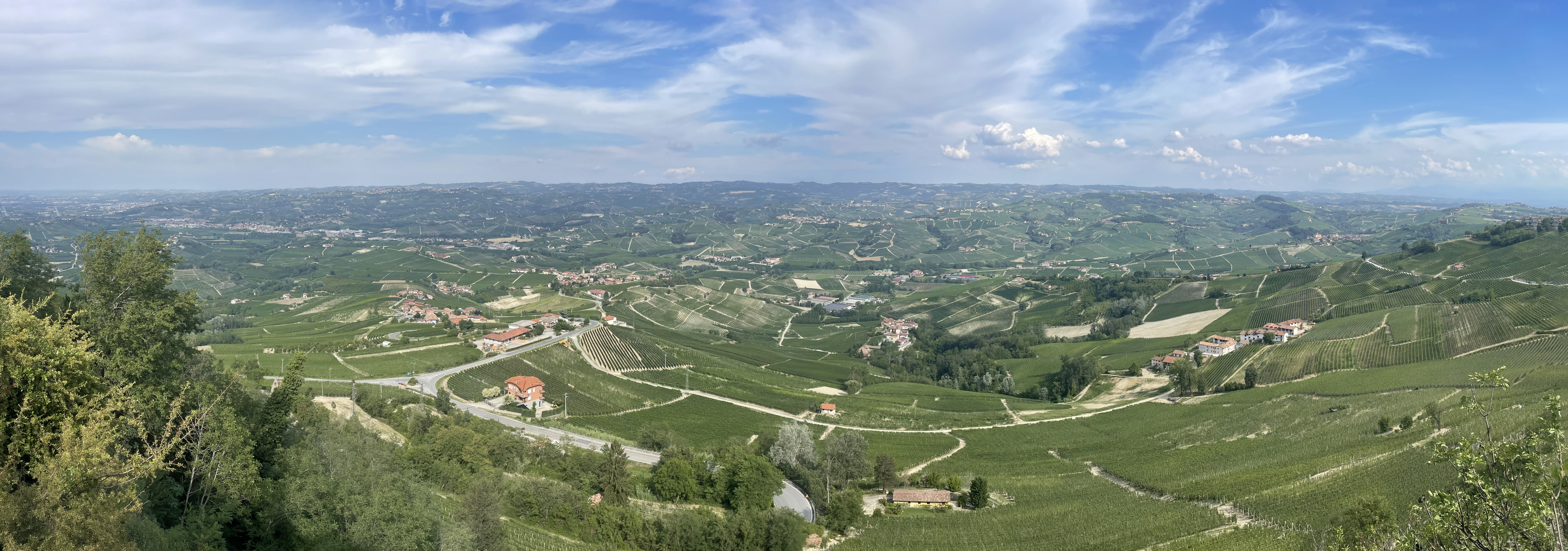
Panoramic view of the Langhe from La Morra lookout
