= Scarampi =

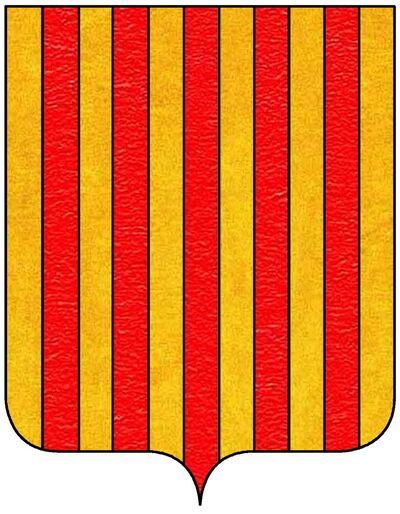
- Parent house: Aleramici
- Country: Italy
- Founded: 1339
- Founder: Antonio Scarampi
- Titles: Marquess of Borgo S. Martino (1750), Canelli (1602), Loazzolo (1602), Mioglia (1529), Montaldo Scarampi (1602), Prunetto e Levice (1560), Villanova (1701) Count of Brusaschetto, Camino, Castel S. Pietro, Rive, Solonghello; Barons of Nus Signori of Bruno, Cairo Montenotte, Castelrocchero, Cessole, Cortemiglia, Vinchio, Mombarone, Mombercelli, Monale, Monastero, Montechiaro, Rhins, Roccaverano, Torre Uzzone, Torrione, Vesime, Viale
- Estates: Asti, Langhe, Monferrato

The Scarampi family is an old and prominent Ghibelline Italian noble family of Asti and its environs in north-west Italy.

== History ==
They were bankers of the Casane astigiane first in Genoa and then in France and in Belgium. In 1337 Antonio Scarampi, in exchange for 115,000 florins, became feudatory of Bubbio, Monastero Bormida, Roccaverano, Cortemilia, Perletto, Cairo, Altare and other places of the Langhe. Oddone, Giacomo and Giovannone, three of the five sons of Antonio, each originated their own lineages. Notably, the lineages that are still present nowadays are: Scarampi del Cairo, Scarampi di Villanova and Scarampi di Pruney.

== Notable members ==
- Guglielmo Scarampi, Podestà of Genoa in 1264.
- Enrico Scarampi, Bishop of Acqui, Bishop of Belluno-Feltre, and participant in the Council of Constance in 1414–1418.
- Francesco Scarampi di Moncucco e Monale, Mayor of Turin in 1725
- Girolamo Scarampi, Bishop of Campagna from 1571 to 1584
- Giuseppe Maria Scarampi, Bishop of Vigevano from 1757 to 1801
- Lazzaro Scarampi, Bishop of Como from 1461 to 1466
- Ludovico Scarampi Mezzarota (1401–1465), doctor, condottiere and cardinal
- Luigi Scarampi del Cairo, Mayor of Turin in 1783
- Rolando Scarampi, from the branch of the family who were counts of Camino, and perhaps from Casale, was Bishop of Reggio Emilia from c.1336 to c.1339.
- Pierfrancesco Scarampi (1596–1656) a Roman Catholic oratorian and Papal envoy to Confederate Ireland.
- Ottavio Maria Scarampi del Cairo (1672–1728), commander of the vessel of the Grand Master of the Sovereign Military Order of Malta and navy captain under Victor Amadeus II
- Galeazzo Scarampi del Cairo (1878–1939), officer of the Military Order of Italy and Major general of the Royal Italian Army

The name Scarampi is also used in the toponyms of various places which were fiefs of the family, including Montaldo Scarampi and San Giorgio Scarampi. Several castles are associated with the Scarampi family, including the Castle of Camino and Castle of Monforte d'Alba.

== Notes ==
This article was originally translated from its counterpart in the Italian Wikipedia.
