= Mango, Piedmont =

Mango
- Comune
- Comune di Mango
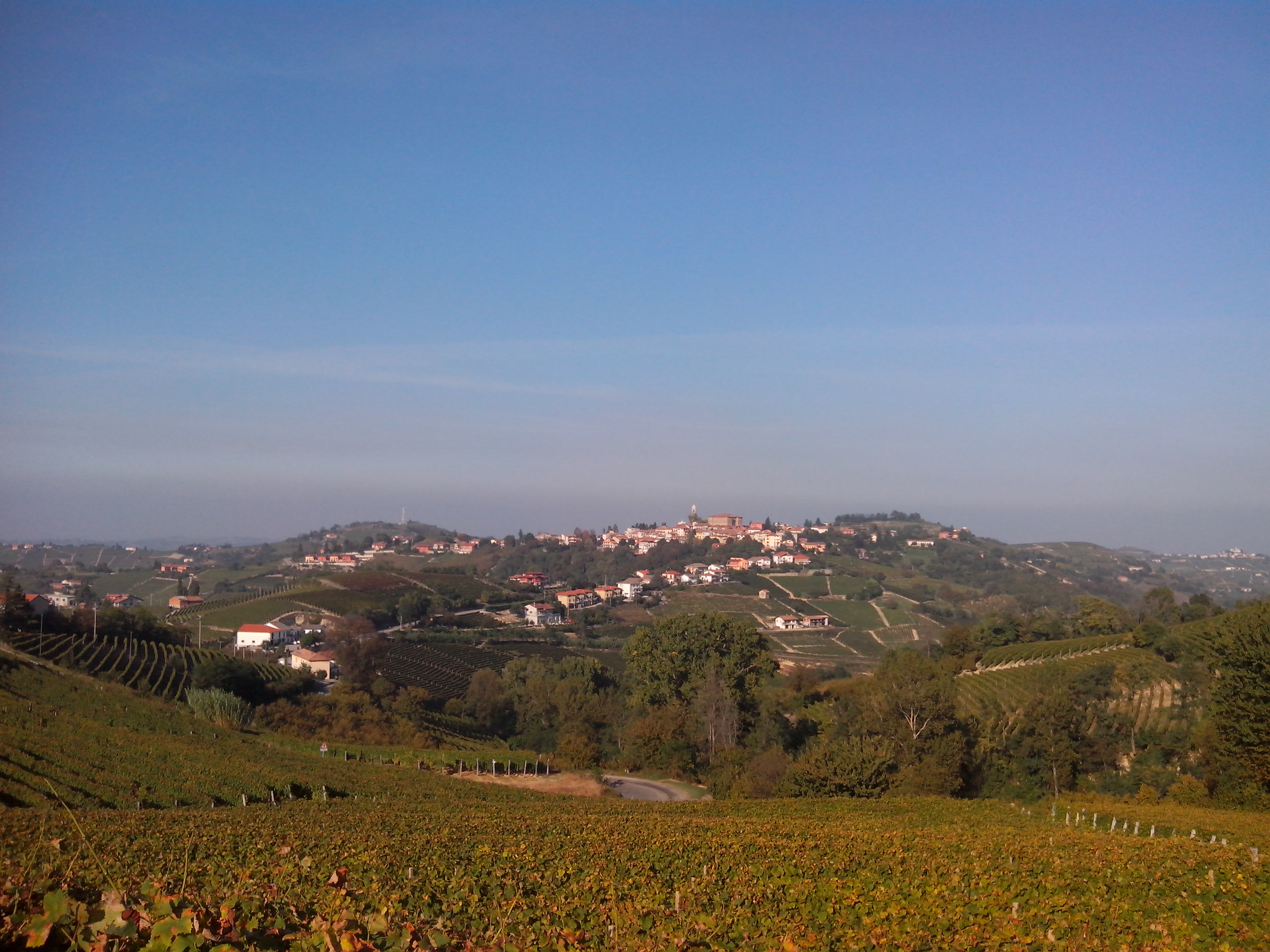

- Location within Italy Location within Piedmont
- Coordinates: 44°41′N 8°9′E
- Country: Italy
- Region: Piedmont
- Province: Cuneo (CN)

Government
  - Mayor: Silvio Stupino

Area
  - Total: 20.03 km^{2} (7.73 sq mi)
- Elevation: 521 m (1,709 ft)

Population (30 September 2017)
  - Total: 1,301
  - Density: 64.95/km^{2} (168.2/sq mi)
- Demonym: Manghesi
- Time zone: UTC+1 (CET)
  - Summer (DST): UTC+2 (CEST)
- Postal code: 12056
- Dialing code: 0141
- Website: Official website

Mango is a comune (municipality) in the Province of Cuneo in the Italian region Piedmont, located about 60 kilometres (37 mi) southeast of Turin and about 60 kilometres (37 mi) northeast of Cuneo.

Mango borders the following municipalities: Camo, Castino, Coazzolo, Cossano Belbo, Neive, Neviglie, Rocchetta Belbo, Santo Stefano Belbo, and Trezzo Tinella.
