= Barbaresco (disambiguation) =

Barbaresco may refer to:

- Barbaresco, an Italian wine made with the Nebbiolo grape
- Barbaresco, Piedmont, a municipality in the Province of Cuneo in the Italian region Piedmont
- Enzo Barbaresco, a former football referee from Italy
