= Cossano Belbo =

- Comune
- Comune di Cossano Belbo
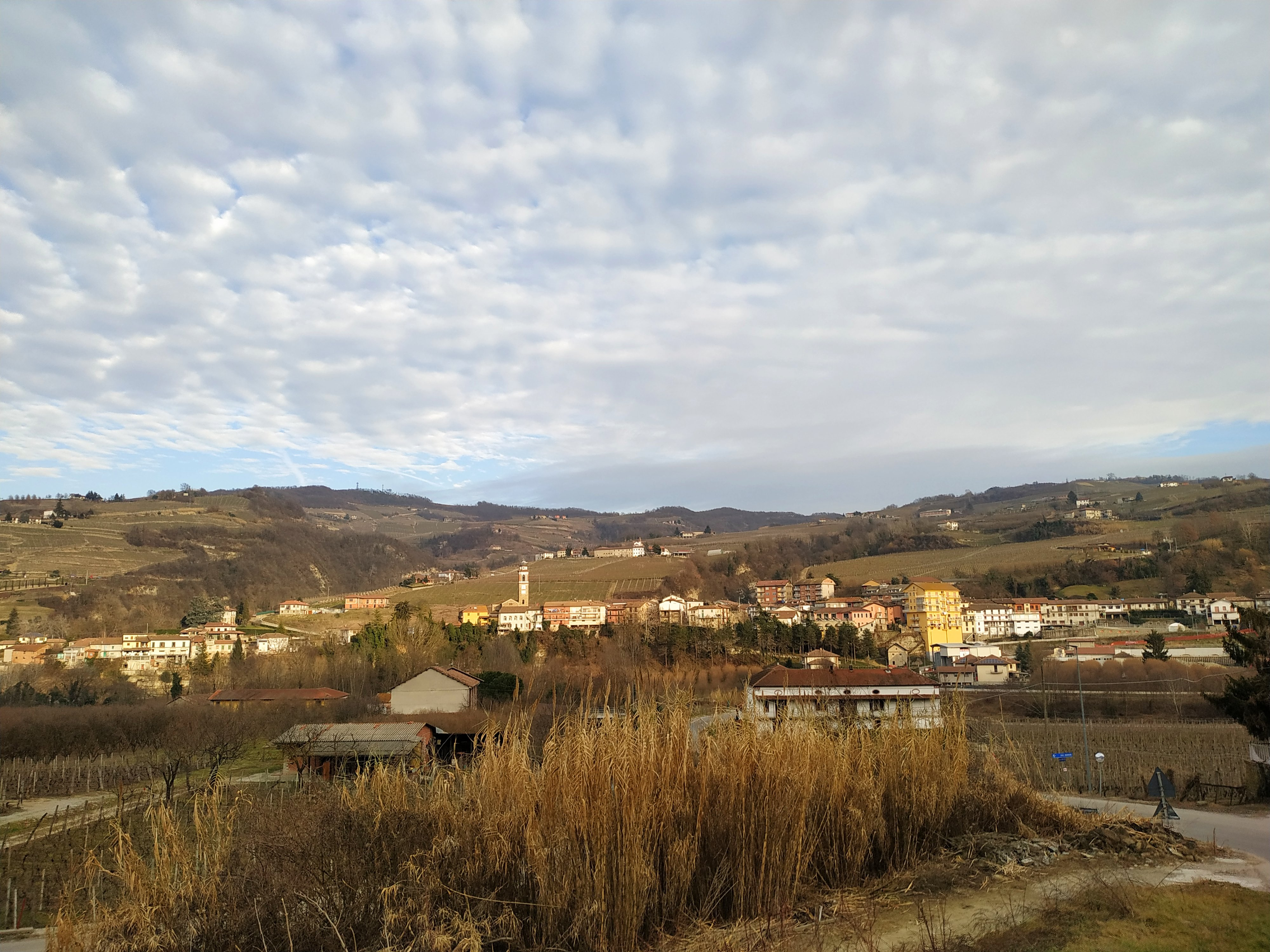
- A view over Cossano Belbo

- Location within Italy Location within Piedmont
- Coordinates: 44°40′N 8°12′E
- Country: Italy
- Region: Piedmont
- Province: Cuneo (CN)

Government
  - Mayor: Mauro Noè

Area
  - Total: 20.54 km^{2} (7.93 sq mi)
- Elevation: 244 m (801 ft)

Population (30 November 2017)
  - Total: 964
  - Density: 46.9/km^{2} (122/sq mi)
- Demonym: Cossanesi
- Time zone: UTC+1 (CET)
  - Summer (DST): UTC+2 (CEST)
- Postal code: 12054
- Dialing code: 0141

Cossano Belbo is a comune (municipality) in the Province of Cuneo in the Italian region Piedmont, located about 60 kilometres (37 mi) southeast of Turin and about 60 kilometres (37 mi) northeast of Cuneo.

Cossano Belbo borders the following municipalities: Camo, Cessole, Loazzolo, Mango, Rocchetta Belbo, Santo Stefano Belbo, and Vesime.
