= Trezzo Tinella =

Trezzo Tinella Trés
- Comune
- Comune di Trezzo Tinella

- Location within Italy Location within Piedmont
- Coordinates: 44°41′N 8°6′E
- Country: Italy
- Region: Piedmont
- Province: Province of Cuneo (CN)
- Frazioni: Cappelletto, Mompiano, Leomonte

Government
  - Mayor: VIAZZI Mario

Area
  - Total: 10.4 km^{2} (4.0 sq mi)
- Elevation: 341 m (1,119 ft)

Population (Dec. 2008)
  - Total: 350
  - Density: 34/km^{2} (87/sq mi)
- Time zone: UTC+1 (CET)
  - Summer (DST): UTC+2 (CEST)
- Postal code: 12050
- Dialing code: 0173
- Patron saint: Sant'Antonio Abate
- Website: Official website

Trezzo Tinella is a comune (municipality) in the Province of Cuneo in the Italian region Piedmont, located about 50 kilometres (31 mi) southeast of Turin and about 50 kilometres northeast of Cuneo. As of 31 December 2004, it had a population of 350 and an area of 10.4 square kilometres (4.0 mi^{2}).

The small and affable commune of Trezzo Tinella is located high in the Langa region. It occupies a very large territory situated at different elevations from 304 to 712 metres (997 to 2,336 ft) above sea level. At the centre of the commune is a church and the town hall. There was once a castle, the final tower of the castle collapsed in 1969. There was also a nursery and school which was closed in 1986. Trezzo Tinella has dairy farms, vineyards, hazelnut groves and houses. A number of the buildings date back to Roman Times and the names derive from this era.

Trezzo Tinella borders the following municipalities: Alba, Borgomale, Castino, Mango, Neviglie, and Treiso.

== Demographic evolution ==
Historical population

Year	Pop.	±%
1861	825	—
1871	846	+2.5%
1881	866	+2.4%
1901	929	+7.3%
1911	993	+6.9%

Year	Pop.	±%
1921	1,062	+6.9%
1931	1,024	−3.6%
1936	1,007	−1.7%
1951	768	−23.7%
1961	574	−25.3%

Year	Pop.	±%
1971	498	−13.2%
1981	408	−18.1%
1991	363	−11.0%
2001	356	−1.9%

Source: Data from ISTAT
