= Castagnole-Asti-Mortara railway =

Overview
- Status: Partially operational
- Locale: Piedmont and Lombardy, Italy
- Termini: Mortara; Castagnole delle Lanze

Technical
- Line length: 93 km (58 mi)
- Track gauge: 1,435 mm (4 ft 8 1/2 in) standard gauge

The Castagnole-Asti-Mortara railway (Italian: Ferrovia Castagnole-Asti-Mortara) is a state-owned, standard gauge railway line in Italy, connecting the railway hub of Castagnole delle Lanze to that of Mortara which passes through Casale Monferrato and the railway junction of Asti.

The resumption of the regional service had been preceded since 2018 by the operation of tourist trains along the route Castagnole delle Lanze-Asti, as well as in September 2022 of a historic train between Mortara and Casale Monferrato.

== History ==
=== Slow decline ===
After a few months of work, the line was reopened on August 10, 1991.

The entire route is 93 kilometers long, with a 38.5% gradient of curved sections; the maximum gradient is 4.3 per thousand, with peaks of 10.7. Among the numerous works of art are five bridges and viaducts with two to sixteen arches, two steel girder bridges with four and six spans, and four tunnels totaling 2,465 meters in length.

== Bibliography ==
- Rete Ferroviaria Italiana, Fascicolo linea 10 (Castagnole–Asti).
- Rete Ferroviaria Italiana, Fascicolo linea 12 (Asti–Mortara).
- Luigi Ballatore (2002). Storia delle ferrovie in Piemonte. Torino: Editrice Il Punto. ISBN 88-88552-00-6.
