= Borgomale =

- Comune
- Comune di Borgomale
- Location within Italy Location within Piedmont
- Coordinates: 44°37′N 8°8′E
- Country: Italy
- Region: Piedmont
- Province: Cuneo (CN)

Government
  - Mayor: Massimo Antoniotto

Area
  - Total: 8.4 km^{2} (3.2 sq mi)

Population (30 November 2017)
  - Total: 389
  - Density: 46/km^{2} (120/sq mi)
- Time zone: UTC+1 (CET)
  - Summer (DST): UTC+2 (CEST)
- Postal code: 12050
- Dialing code: 0173

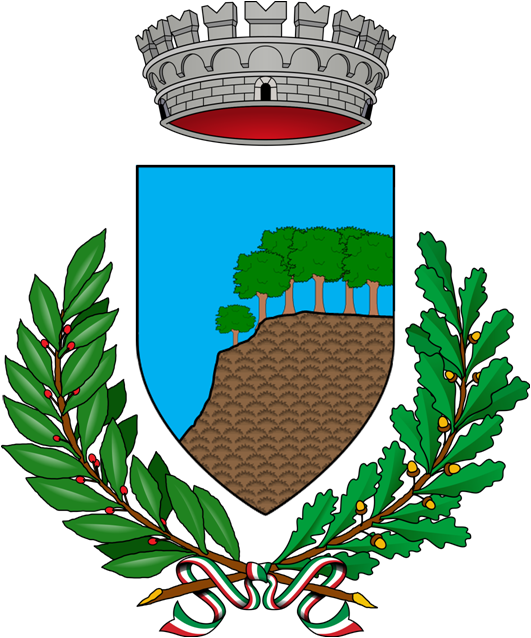
Coat of arms of Borgomale

Borgomale is a comune (municipality) in the Province of Cuneo in the Italian region Piedmont, located about 60 kilometres (37 mi) southeast of Turin and about 50 kilometres (31 mi) northeast of Cuneo.

Borgomale borders the following municipalities: Alba, Benevello, Bosia, Castino, Lequio Berria, and Trezzo Tinella.

The 15th-century castle in the village was formerly owned by the Falletti Marquises of Barolo. It was built on an existing fortification. It became a residential place after the passage of Borgomale to Casa Savoia (1631, Peace of Cherasco), and figures among the "Open Castles" of Lower Piedmont.

The name of the village is connected with the concept of 'apple tree' (Italian melo) and/or 'apple' (Italian mela) and the current denomination of the village, with '-male' ('bad', 'evil'), derives from a bona fide paretimology produced over time by the local speakers and due to the confusion between Latin mălum, 'bad ', 'evil', and Latin mālum, 'apple 'and/or 'apple tree'. Borgomale was originally 'the village of apples', or 'the village of the apple trees', and, over time, it became 'the bad village', or 'the village of evil', due to the misunderstanding of the vowel 'quantity' of the Latin lexemes related to its toponym.
