= Barbaresco =

Italian red wine

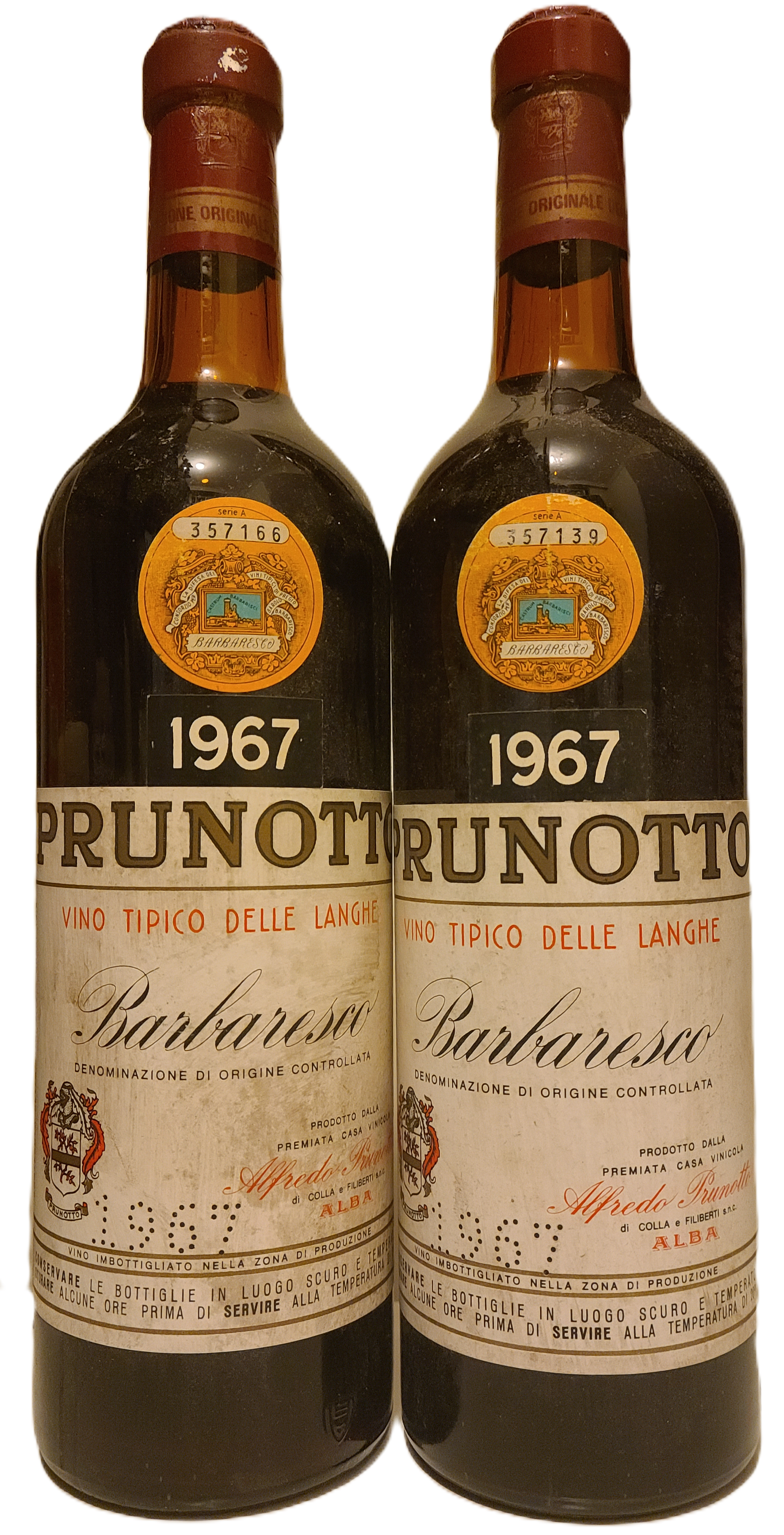
Prunotto Barbaresco 1967

Barbaresco is an Italian wine made from the Nebbiolo grape. Barbaresco is produced in the Piedmont region in an area of the Langhe immediately to the east of Alba and specifically in the comunes of Barbaresco, Treiso and Neive, plus that area of the frazione San Rocco Seno d'Elvio, which was once part of the comune of Barbaresco and now belongs to the comune of Alba. It was granted Denominazione di origine controllata (DOC) status in 1966 and Denominazione di Origine Controllata e Garantita (DOCG) status in 1980. The wine is often compared with Barolo—another Nebbiolo-based wine from the Piedmont area. Though the wines do share many similarities, there are some distinct differences between them.

The area under vine has increased dramatically over the last few decades - from 484 hectares in the early 1990s to 733 hectares in 2019.

== History ==
Although it was already well known for the quality of its Nebbiolo grapes, the widely accepted birthdate of Barbaresco is 1894, when Cantina Sociale di Barbaresco was founded, as before that date Nebbiolo grapes from the Barbaresco area were mostly sold to Barolo producers. Domizio Cavazza, a young and brilliant agronomist born in Modena, was named the founding director of Alba's Royal Enological School in 1881 and soon began developing his passion for Barbaresco, which led to his purchase of a farm and a vineyard in 1886. He cultivated its vineyard with Nebbiolo and, with a group of nine growers, founded the Cantina Sociale, outfitted with barrels and winemaking equipment to produce what are considered the first wines officially called Barbaresco. After a good start, Barbaresco fell on hard times during World War I and the premature death of Cavazza in 1915.

It was not until the late 1950s that Barbaresco would stir to life again, thanks to a new generation of dynamic winemakers, including Bruno Giacosa and Angelo Gaja. In addition, the local parish priest, Don Fiorino Marengo, founded the Produttori del Barbaresco cooperative cellar, the successor to Cavazza's original vision of making outstanding wine and stopping the exodus of young farmers abandoning the countryside.

By the late 1960s, the Gaja and Bruno Giacosa wineries began to market Barbaresco internationally with some success. The Produttori cooperative became one of the most respected cellars in Italy and inspired more landholders in Barbaresco to return to their vineyards and to make quality wine.

== Wine regions ==
The soils of the Barbaresco zone are composed primarily of calcareous marl dating from the Tortonian epoch. The area is typically divided into three regions based on the principal towns - Barbaresco, Neive, and Treiso. The soil and climate of the three areas are very uniform, creating more across-the-board consistency than is found among the 11 communities in the Barolo zone.

=== Barbaresco ===
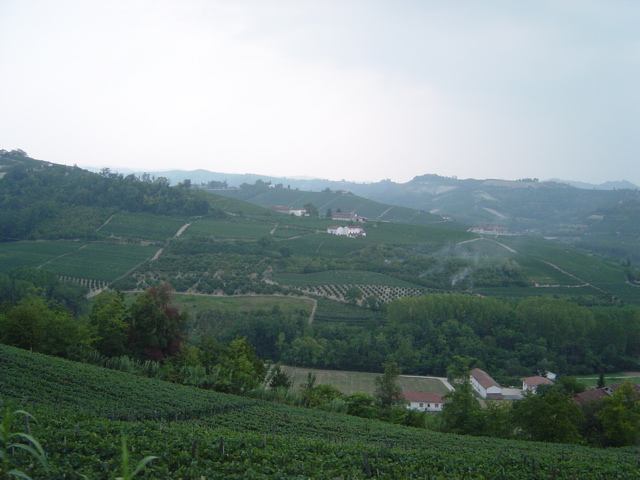
Vineyards and hillsides near the comune of Barbaresco

The vineyards around the town of Barbaresco make up for 45 per cent of Barbaresco production, with many of the area's largest wineries located in town. Wines from this area tend to be relatively light in colour and body, but very well structured and aromatic.

=== Neive ===
In Neive, the Nebbiolo grape is fourth in plantings behind the cultivation of Barbera, Dolcetto and Moscato (it has been termed the "township of four wines"), but this region is known for making some of the most powerful and tannic expressions of Barbaresco. Neive now has 265 hectares of Nebbiolo, up from 140 hectares in 1995. The area is also home to the highly esteemed Nebbiolo vineyards of Santo Stefano in the cru of Albesani, with its ideal south-western exposure in the centre of the Albesani hill, and Bricco di Neive, whose names are starting to appear on some single-vineyard bottlings. The latter is located in the south-east of the region, between the villages of Moniprandi and Cascina Spessa. Despite the high altitude, the Nebbiolo wines here are rich in volume, while Moscato is widely grown. Located east of Barbaresco and the largest of the villages, Neive is responsible for 31 per cent of Barbaresco's production and makes some of the most full-bodied and tannic examples of the wine.

The area is bisected by a valley, in the midst of which lies the village of Neive itself.

The vineyards have been described by Masnaghetti as lying in three distinct subregions:

The northern area contains gentle ridges.

The southwestern region consists of a low hill, with the Cascina San Cristoforo lying right on top. A gentle slope runs down toward the Barbaresco village to the west. Steeper slopes lie to the south and east, the latter marked by a deep basin at the edge of the hill.

The southeastern region is a series of ridges. Moscato is a significant grape here, mostly planted in the cooler areas facing eastwards, while Nebbiolo is more common on the warmer ridges with a westerly orientation.

=== Treiso ===
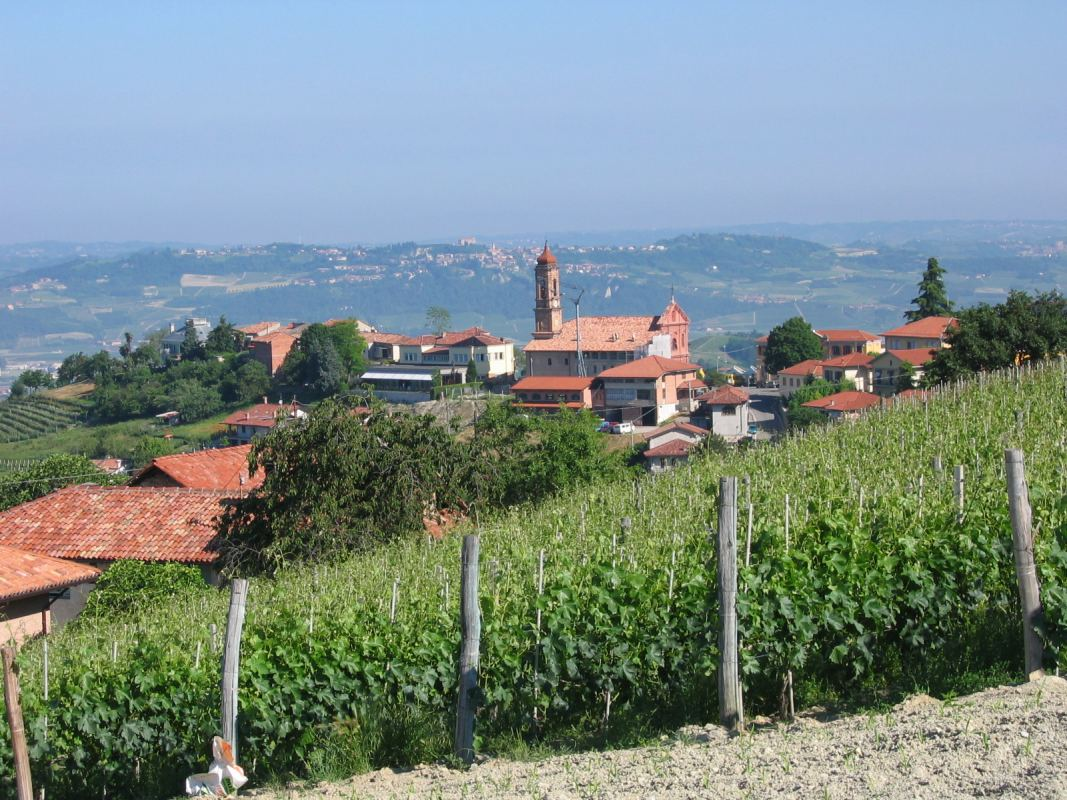
A vineyard in Treiso

Located south of Barbaresco, with vineyards on the highest hilltop sites in the area, Treiso wines tend to be the lightest in body and are principally known for their finesse. A smaller area, Treiso accounts for 20 per cent of the Barbaresco zone's production.

=== Vineyard classifications ===
Beginning in the late 19th century, there have been attempts to classify the area's vineyards into Burgundian-like crus based on which areas produced the best wines. The Italian wine critic Luigi Veronelli created one such list in the 1960s, and other writers and viticulturists attempted to create their own in the 1970s. Today, many follow the lists compiled by the négociant, which rank grapes by price based on performance. These lists typically include the Asili, Martinenga, Montefico, Montestefano and Rabajà vineyards in Barbaresco, the Albesani, Santo Stefano, Bricco di Neive and Gallina vineyards in Neive, and the Pajorè vineyard in Treiso.

In 2007, the Barbaresco Consorzio was the first to introduce the Menzioni Geografiche Aggiuntive (additional geographic mentions), also known as MEGA or subzones; there were 65 officially approved subzones, with one more approved in 2010, bringing the final number to 66. The main goal was to establish official boundaries for some of the most storied crus to protect them from unjustified expansion and exploitation. Following the introductions of subzones, the term Vigna (Italian for vineyard) can be used on labels after its respective MEGA and only if the vineyard lies within one of the approved MEGAs.

== Wines ==
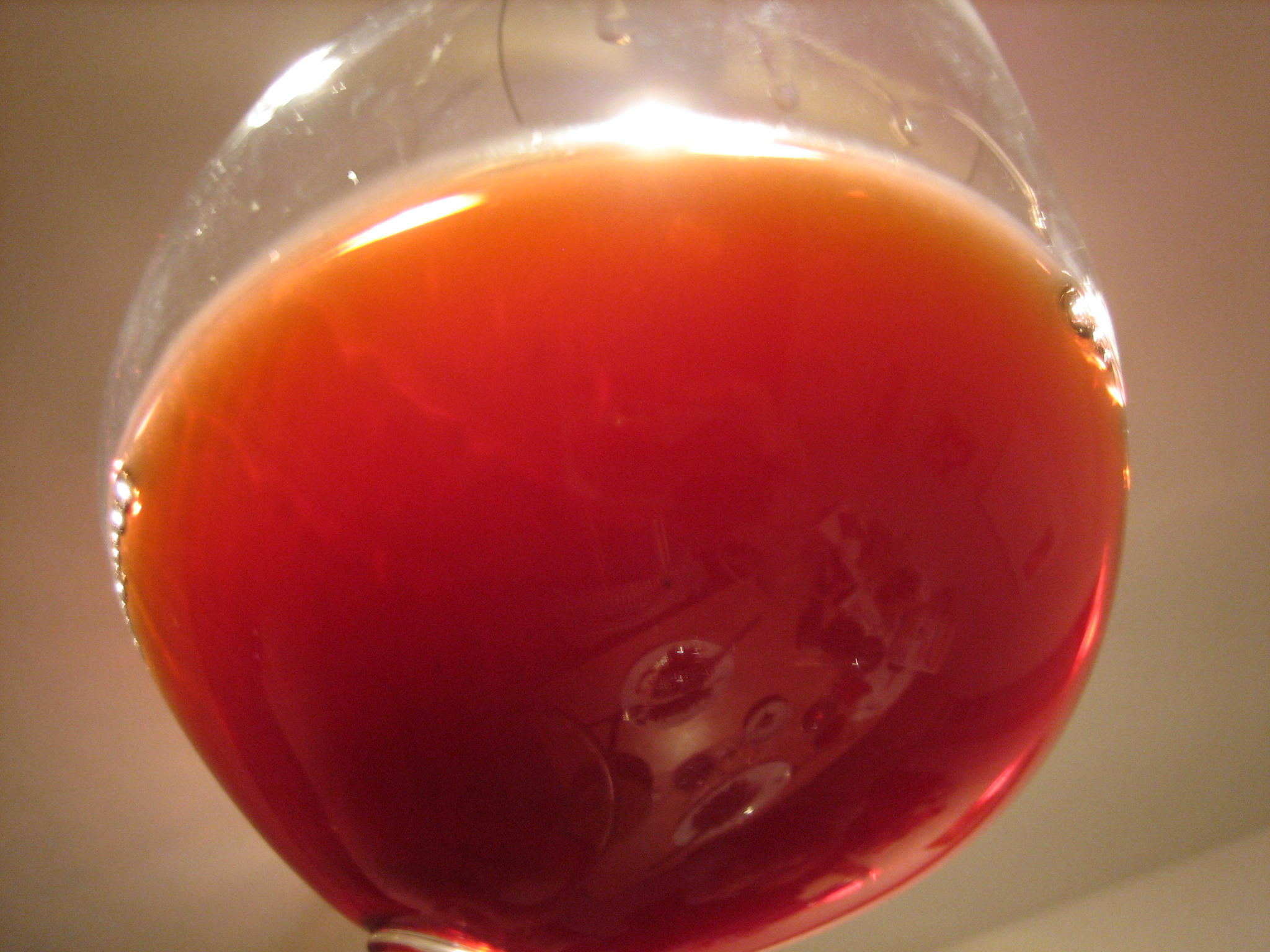
Like most red wines, Barbarescos become lighter and more brick in colour. This wine is from the 1976 vintage.

DOCG regulations stipulate that Barbaresco wines must be aged for a minimum of 2 years (at least 9 months in wooden barrels) prior to release and for at least 4 years to be considered a riserva. The wines must have a minimum alcohol level of 12.5 per cent, though most are closer to 13.5 per cent. Well-made Barbaresco wines are expected to be aged for 5 to 10 years after vintage before they are consumed, as they are extremely tannic and tight in their youth, and some continue to drink well even after 20 years. The typical style of a Barbaresco has bouquets of roses or violets with flavour notes of cherry, truffles, fennel and liquorice. As the wine ages, it can develop smoky notes and more earthy, animal flavours such as leather and tar.

=== Differences from Barolo ===
Despite being made from the same grape and produced in neighbouring areas, less than 10 miles apart, the wines of Barbaresco and Barolo do have some distinct differences. Located south of the river Tanaro, the Barbaresco zone receives a slight maritime influence, which allows Nebbiolo to ripen a little earlier than it does in the Barolo zone, allowing earlier fermentation with a shorter maceration time. The early tannins in a young Barbaresco are not quite as harsh as those in Barolo, and under DOCG rules, it is allowed to age for a year less than Barolo. The Barolo wines that tend to be closer in body, fruitiness, and perfume to Barbaresco wines are generally the ones produced near the villages of La Morra and Barolo. The most pronounced difference between the two wines is that the tannins of Barbaresco tend to soften more quickly, which can make the wines more approachable to drink at an earlier age, but won't allow them to age as long as a traditionally made Barolo could. The smaller vineyard areas mean that the Barbaresco's annual production is around 35 per cent of Barolo's, and therefore the wines are not as widely available on the market. However, the smaller area does generally produce more consistent profiles among the Barbarescos than across the more expansive Barolo zone.

== "Crus"/Menzioni Geografiche Aggiuntive (MGA) ==
=== Barbaresco ===
- Asili
- Cà Grossa
- Cars
- Cavanna
- Cole
- Faset
- Martinenga
- Montaribaldi
- Montefico
- Montestefano
- Muncagota
- Ovello
- Pajè
- Rabajà
- Rabajà-Bas
- Rio Sordo
- Roccalini
- Roncagliette
- Ronchi
- Secondine
- Tre Stelle
- Trifolera
- Vicenziana
