= Camo, Cuneo =

Camo
- Frazione

- Location of Camo in Italy
- Coordinates: 44°42′N 8°12′E
- Country: Italy
- Region: Piedmont
- Province: Cuneo (CN)
- Comune: Santo Stefano Belbo
- Elevation: 471 m (1,545 ft)

Population (30 October 2011)
  - Total: 111
- Demonym: Camolesi
- Time zone: UTC+1 (CET)
  - Summer (DST): UTC+2 (CEST)
- Postal code: 12050
- Dialing code: 0141

Camo is a frazione of the comune of Santo Stefano Belbo in the Province of Cuneo, in the Italian region Piedmont, located about 60 kilometres (37 mi) southeast of Turin and about 60 km northeast of Cuneo.

The municipality of Camo was abolished on 31 December 2018. The former comune bordered the following municipalities: Cossano Belbo, Mango, Santo Stefano Belbo.
