= Coazzolo =

- Comune
- Comune di Coazzolo
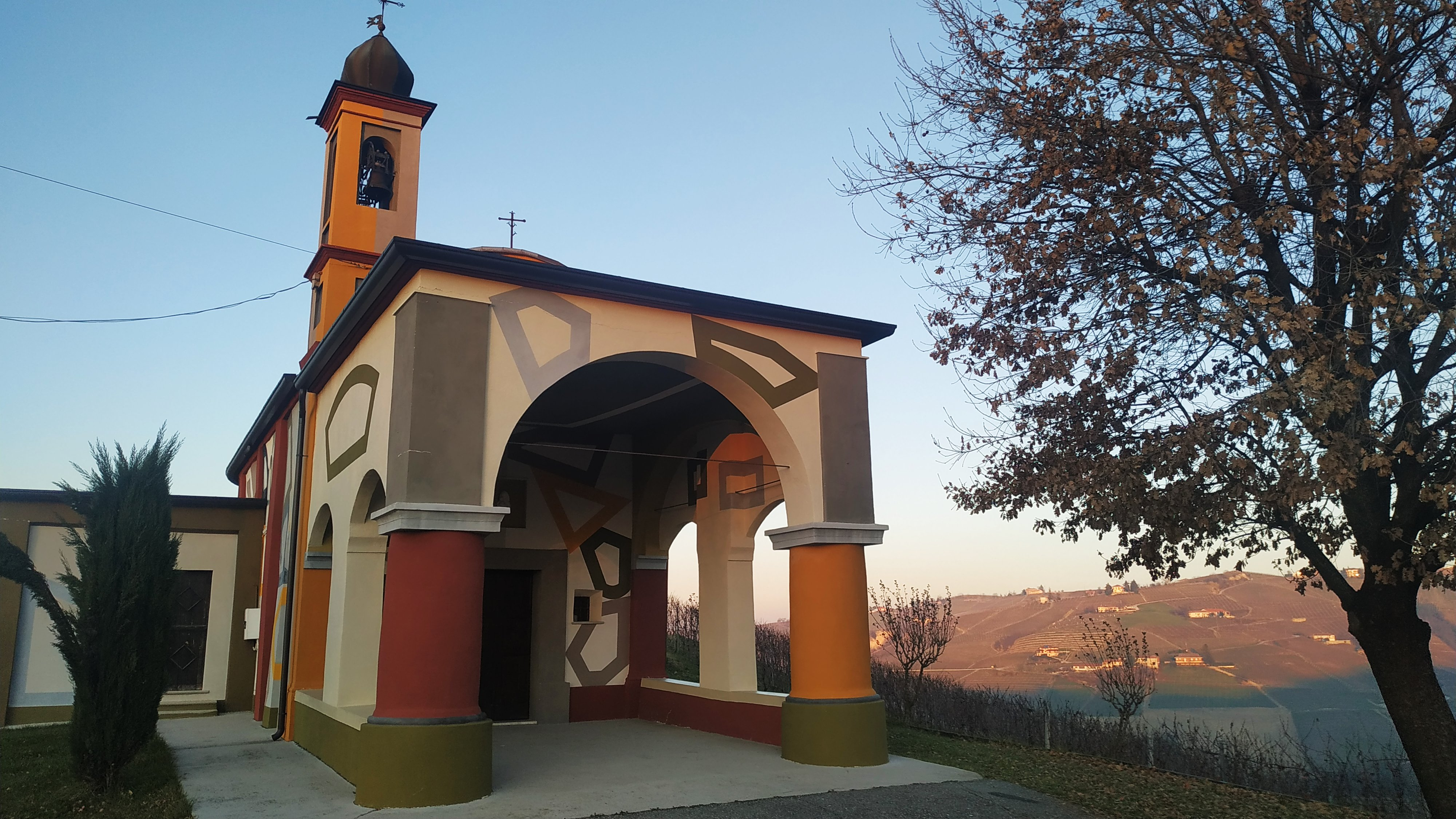
- Coazzolo, David Tremlett's chapel

- Location within Italy Location within Piedmont
- Coordinates: 44°44′N 8°9′E
- Country: Italy
- Region: Piedmont
- Province: Province of Asti (AT)

Area
  - Total: 4.1 km^{2} (1.6 sq mi)

Population (Dec. 2004)
  - Total: 301
  - Density: 73/km^{2} (190/sq mi)
- Time zone: UTC+1 (CET)
  - Summer (DST): UTC+2 (CEST)
- Postal code: 14054
- Dialing code: 0141

Coazzolo is a comune (municipality) in the Province of Asti in the Italian region Piedmont, located about 50 kilometres (31 mi) southeast of Turin and about 20 kilometres (12 mi) south of Asti. As of 31 December 2004, it had a population of 301 and an area of 4.1 square kilometres (1.6 mi^{2}).

Coazzolo borders the following municipalities: Castagnole delle Lanze, Castiglione Tinella, Mango, Neive, and Santo Stefano Belbo.

== Demographic evolution ==
Historical population

Year	Pop.	±%
1861	435	—
1871	483	+11.0%
1881	576	+19.3%
1901	664	+15.3%
1911	635	−4.4%

Year	Pop.	±%
1921	591	−6.9%
1931	589	−0.3%
1936	508	−13.8%
1951	443	−12.8%
1961	353	−20.3%

Year	Pop.	±%
1971	272	−22.9%
1981	268	−1.5%
1991	282	+5.2%
2001	300	+6.4%

Source: Data from ISTAT
