= Vesime =

- Comune
- Comune di Vesime
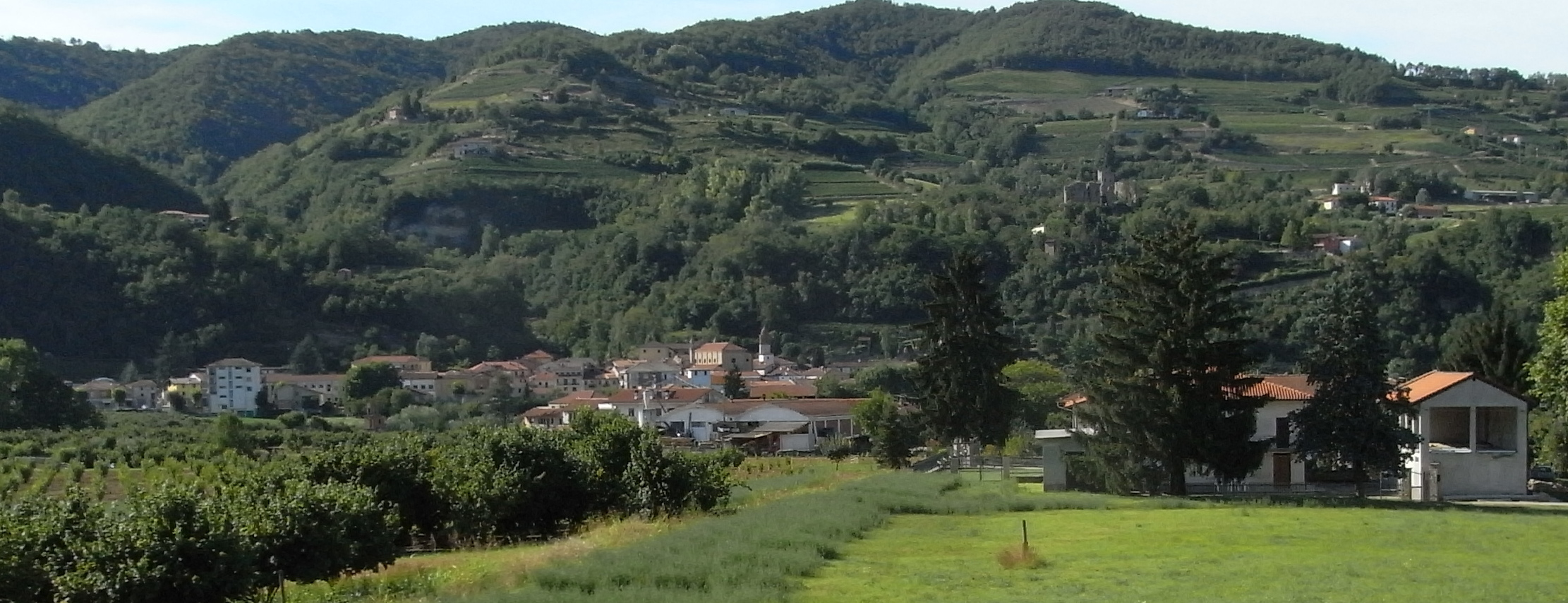

- Location within Italy Location within Piedmont
- Coordinates: 44°38′N 8°14′E
- Country: Italy
- Region: Piedmont
- Province: Province of Asti (AT)

Area
  - Total: 13.5 km^{2} (5.2 sq mi)

Population (Dec. 2004)
  - Total: 683
  - Density: 50.6/km^{2} (131/sq mi)
- Time zone: UTC+1 (CET)
  - Summer (DST): UTC+2 (CEST)
- Postal code: 14059
- Dialing code: 0144
- Website: Official website

Vesime is a comune (municipality) in the Province of Asti in the Italian region Piedmont, located about 60 kilometres (37 mi) southeast of Turin and about 30 kilometres (19 mi) south of Asti. As of 31 December 2004, it had a population of 683 and an area of 13.5 square kilometres (5.2 mi^{2}).

Vesime borders the following municipalities: Castino, Cessole, Cossano Belbo, Perletto, Roccaverano, Rocchetta Belbo, and San Giorgio Scarampi.

== Demographic evolution ==
Historical population

Year	Pop.	±%
1861	1,321	—
1871	1,481	+12.1%
1881	1,531	+3.4%
1901	1,720	+12.3%
1911	1,719	−0.1%

Year	Pop.	±%
1921	1,679	−2.3%
1931	1,640	−2.3%
1936	1,546	−5.7%
1951	1,297	−16.1%
1961	1,075	−17.1%

Year	Pop.	±%
1971	961	−10.6%
1981	834	−13.2%
1991	779	−6.6%
2001	678	−13.0%

Source: Data from ISTAT
