= Vineyard Landscape of Piedmont: Langhe-Roero and Monferrato =

UNESCO World Heritage Site in the Provinces of Alessandria, Asti and Cuneo, Italy

UNESCO World Heritage Site
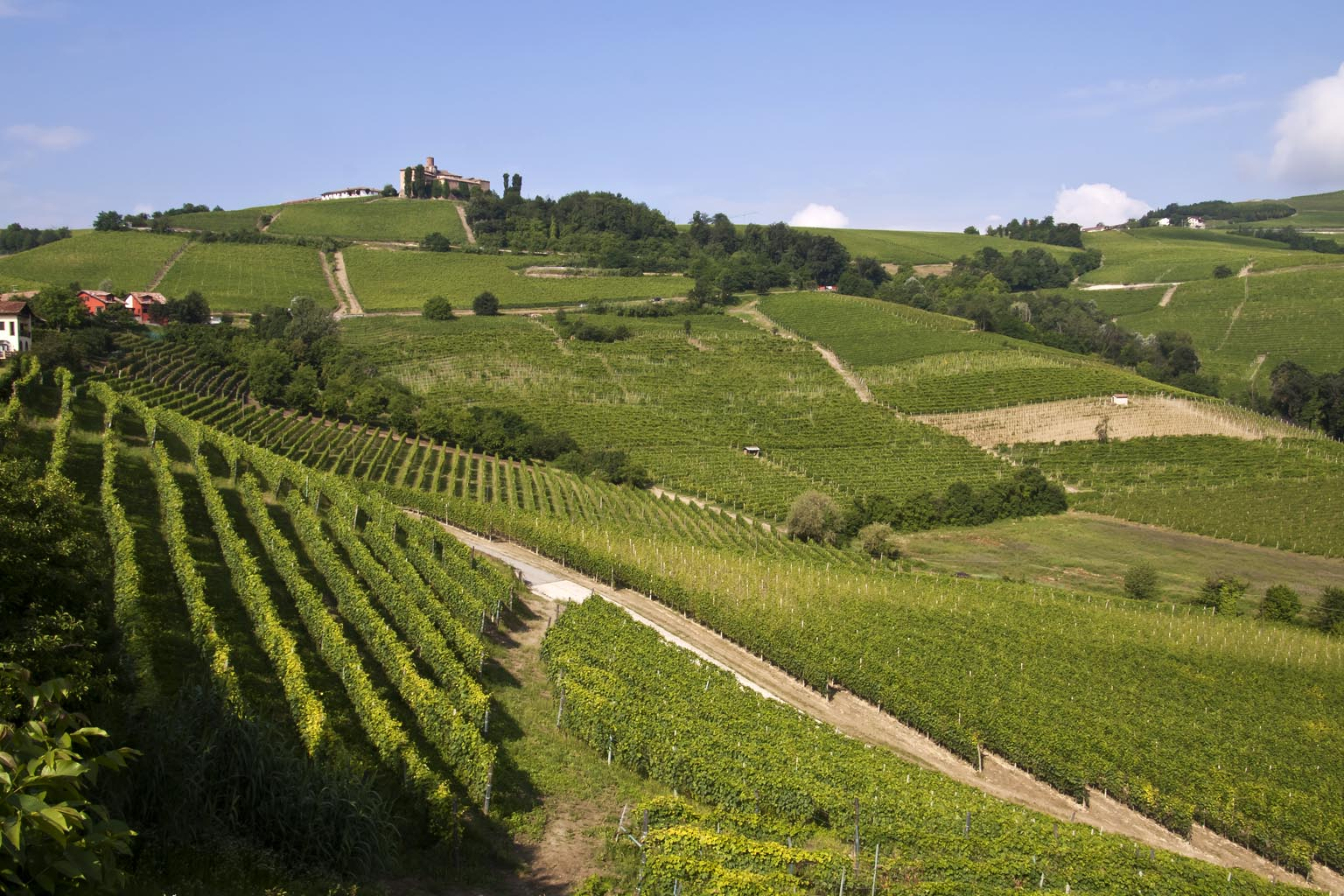

- Location within Italy
- Location: Province of Cuneo, Province of Asti, Province of Alessandria, Italy
- Includes: 1. Langa of Barolo; 2. Grinzane Cavour Castle; 3. Hills of Barbaresco; 4. Nizza Monferrato and Barbera; 5. Canelli and Asti Spumante; 6. Monferrato of the Infernot
- Criteria: Cultural: (iii), (v)
- Reference: 1390rev
- Inscription: 2014 (38th Session)
- Area: 10,789 ha (41.66 sq mi)
- Buffer zone: 76,249 ha (294.40 sq mi)
- Website: www.paesaggivitivinicoli.it/en
- Coordinates: 44°36′31″N 7°57′49″E

Vineyard Landscape of Piedmont: Langhe-Roero and Monferrato is the official name of a UNESCO World Heritage Site comprising "five distinct wine-growing areas with outstanding landscapes" plus the Castle of Grinzane Cavour in the region of Piedmont, Italy.

The site, which extends over hilly areas of Langhe and Montferrat, is one of the most important wine producing zones in Italy.

Located in the center of Piedmont region (North West of Italy), the site is inscribed as a "cultural landscape", since it is a result of the combined work of nature and man. The site is inscribed in the UNESCO World Heritage List thanks to the outstanding value of its wine culture, which has shaped the landscape over the centuries.

== Description ==
The site includes five distinct wine-growing areas of outstanding landscapes and the Castle of Grinzane Cavour, an emblematic name in vineyards development and Italian history. It is located in the southern part of Piedmont, between River Po and the Ligurian Apennines. It includes a full range of technical and economic processes related to viticulture and wine-making that characterized the region for centuries. They found in the area also pollen dated to the 5th century BC, when Piedmont was a place of contact and exchange between the Etruscans and Celts: in fact Etruscan and Celtic words, particularly those related to the wine, are still used in the local dialect. During the Roman Empire, Pliny the Elder mentioned the region as one of the most favorable for the cultivation of vineyards in ancient Italy and Strabo wrote about its barrels.

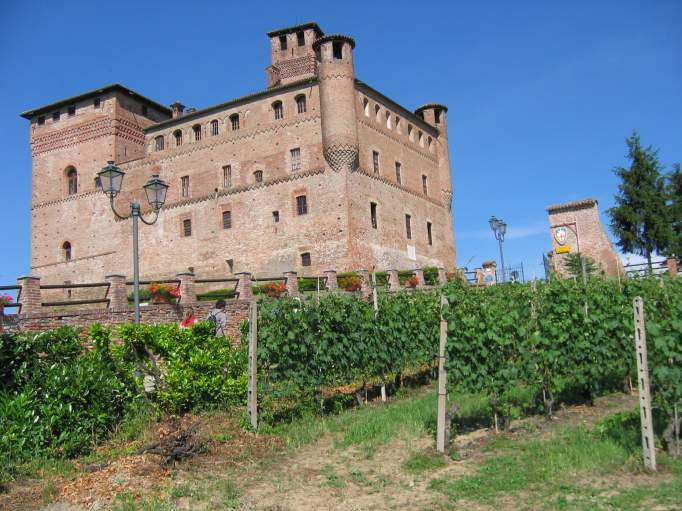
Grinzane Cavour castle

== Sites ==
WHS ID	Site name	Surface area (ha)	Buffer zone (ha)	Coordinates
1390-001	Langa of Barolo	3051	59306	44°36′31″N 7°57′49″E
1390-002	Grinzane Cavour castle	7	59306	44°39′7″N 7°59′39″E
1390-003	Hills of Barbaresco	891	59306	44°43′14″N 8°5′15″E
1390-004	Nizza Monferrato and Barbera	2307	59306	44°47′47″N 8°18′18″E
1390-005	Canelli and the Asti Spumante	1971	59306	44°44′17″N 8°14′59″E
1390-006	Monferrato of the Infernot	2561	16943	45°3′3″N 8°23′23″E
Total		10789	76249	

== See also ==
- Castle of Grinzane Cavour
- Langhe
- Montferrat
- Piedmont
- UNESCO
