= Grinzane Cavour Castle =

UNESCO World Heritage Site
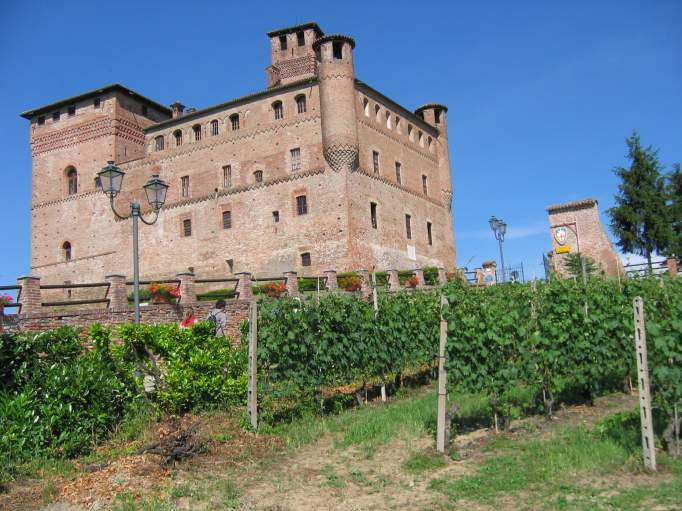

- Location within Piedmont Location within Italy
- Location: Grinzane Cavour, Province of Cuneo, Piedmont, Italy
- Part of: Vineyard Landscape of Piedmont: Langhe-Roero and Monferrato
- Criteria: Cultural: (iii)(v)
- Reference: 1390rev-002
- Inscription: 2014 (38th Session)
- Area: 7 ha (750,000 sq ft)
- Coordinates: 44°39′7″N 7°59′39″E

Grinzane Cavour Castle (Italian: Castello di Grinzane Cavour) is a fortification in Grinzane Cavour, Piedmont, northern Italy.

On 22 June 2014, it was inscribed on the UNESCO World Heritage list.

== History ==
Mentions of the castle's early history are extremely scarce, and its origins have been variously assigned to the 13th century or to around 1350. The castle includes a large tower, which is thought to be the most ancient part of the construction; the rest of the body has similar features, and therefore it is likely that it was built in the same age.

In the 15th century, the castle and the surrounding were owned by the marquis of Busca, whose heraldic symbols have been found in some rooms, under later plasterings. It was later under several lords, the most famous of which was, in the mid-19th century, Camillo Benso, Conte di Cavour, who resided here starting from 1830. Cavour restored the construction and improved the vine cultivations in the area. In 1832 he became mayor of Grinzane, a position he held until 1849. Cavour was also known as the architect of the Unification of Italy.

The castle currently houses an ethnological museum with original furniture items from the 19th century, and rooms dedicated to Cavour's stay and to Italian wine production. The castle also contains the Cavour Regional Enoteca, created in 1967 to showcase the wines of the famous Langhe region of Piedmont – in particular the Barbaresco and Barolo wines, as well as the Michelin Star restaurant, Marc Lanteri Al Castello.

== Description ==
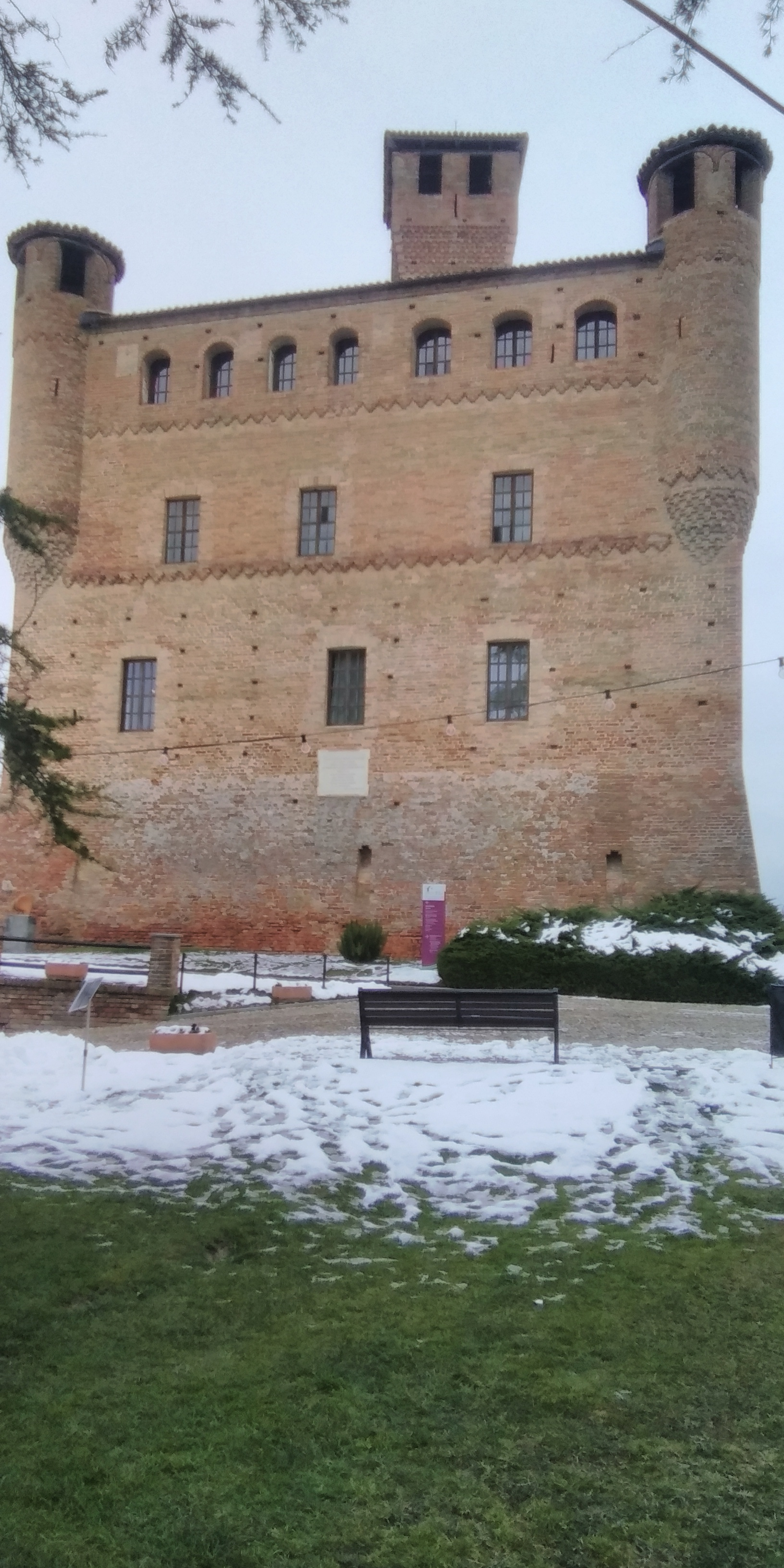
section of the castle

The castle has a rectangular plan and a massive appearance, with a large keep, occupying a whole wing, and a U-shaped structure with a series of turrets: two square and two rounded, the latter, added in the 16th century, being pensile.

There are a series of rooms, one of which, called Sala delle Maschere ("Masques Hall"), has a ceiling decorated with 157 panels featuring coat of arms, animals and allegory images celebrating the marriage of Pietrino Falletti, who owned the castle in 1517.

In 2010 a new building was inaugurated. It houses educational rooms and a hall used for meetings.

In addition the castle contains an enoteca (wine cellar), a cafe and a restaurant.
