= Pierfrancesco Scarampi =

Roman Catholic oratorian and papal envoy

Pierfrancesco Scarampi (1596 – October 14, 1656) was a Roman Catholic oratorian and papal envoy.

== Biography ==
=== Early life and ordination ===
Scarampi was born into the noble Scarampi family in the Marquisate of Montferrat, today a part of Piedmont, in 1596. He was destined by his parents for a military career, but during a visit to the Roman Court, he felt called to a religious life. After much prayer and with the advice of his confessor, he entered the Roman Oratory of St. Philip Neri in 1636.

=== Envoy to Ireland ===
At the request of Luke Wadding, the agent at Rome for the Irish Catholic Confederation, Pope Urban VIII sent Scarampi to assist at the Supreme Council of the Confederation in 1643. Scarampi was well received by the Irish Catholics. Wherever he went he was met by the bishops, clergy, and nobility. He was received with military honours and firing of cannon. On his arrival in Kilkenny, he immediately saw that the danger that threatened the existence of the Confederation was dissension amongst its members. He made an earnest appeal to the Council to avoid all dissension and to make no compromise with the enemies of their religion and country. Richard Bellings, Secretary of the Council, addressed to Scarampi a statement of the reasons to support of a cessation of hostilities. Scarampi immediately gave an answer arguing for a continuation of the war, and that the English desired the cessation of hostilities solely to relieve their present necessities.

The author of Contemporary History of Affairs in Ireland says that Scarampi was a "verie apt and understandinge man, and was receaved with much honour. This man in a shorte time became soe learned in the petegrees of the respective Irish families of Ireland, that it proved his witt and diligence, and allsoe soe well obsearved that all the proceedings of both ancient and recent Irish, that to an ince, he knewe whoe best and worst beheaved himself in the whole kingdome."

The Supreme Council decided to supplicate the pope to raise Scarampi to the dignity of archbishop and Apostolic nuncio, and the bishops of Ireland entreated him to accept the Archbishopric of Tuam, which was vacant at the time. He declined all the honours and refused to walk under the canopy prepared for him in Waterford. He was present with the Confederate forces at the siege of Duncannon, and when the fort was taken on the eve of St. Patrick, he ordered a chapel to be immediately erected in honour of the saint and celebrated the first Mass.

=== Return to Rome ===
On 5 May 1645, he was recalled to Rome by Pope Innocent X. In taking leave of the General Assembly, he thanked all the members for their kindness to him, and again urged them to be firmly united. The President of the Assembly, after referring to all the fatigues that Scarampi had endured for the Irish cause, said "that as long as the name of the Catholic religion remained in Ireland, so long would the name of Scarampi be affectionately remembered and cherished".

After receiving the Apostolic nuncio, Rinuccini, he set out on his journey to Rome. He was accompanied by five Irish youths destined for the priesthood, whom he wished to educate and support at his own expense in Rome. Among these youths was Oliver Plunkett, later the martyr Archbishop of Armagh. On his arrival in Rome, he was thanked and praised by the pope for the great work he had done in Ireland.

=== Service in Rome, and death ===
When the black plague broke out in Rome in 1656, he asked to be allowed to attend the sick in the lazaretto. He caught the sickness and died. By special permission, he was buried in the Basilica of Santi Nereo e Achilleo on the Appian Way, the titular church of Cardinal Baronius. Pope Benedict XIV commanded the Master of the Sacred Palace to make known to the Fathers of the Oratory that the title of Venerable was to be given to Scarampi when writing about him and on his pictures.
