= Neviglie =

- Comune
- Comune di Neviglie
- Location within Italy Location within Piedmont
- Coordinates: 44°41′N 8°7′E
- Country: Italy
- Region: Piedmont
- Province: Province of Cuneo (CN)

Area
  - Total: 8.1 km^{2} (3.1 sq mi)

Population (Dec. 2004)
  - Total: 419
  - Density: 52/km^{2} (130/sq mi)
- Time zone: UTC+1 (CET)
  - Summer (DST): UTC+2 (CEST)
- Postal code: 12050
- Dialing code: 0173

Neviglie is a comune (municipality) in the Province of Cuneo in the Italian region Piedmont, located about 50 kilometres (31 mi) southeast of Turin and about 60 kilometres (37 mi) northeast of Cuneo. As of 31 December 2004, it had a population of 419 and an area of 8.1 square kilometres (3.1 mi^{2}).

Neviglie borders the following municipalities: Mango, Neive, Treiso, and Trezzo Tinella.

== Demographic evolution ==
Historical population

Year	Pop.	±%
1861	583	—
1871	705	+20.9%
1881	777	+10.2%
1901	853	+9.8%
1911	901	+5.6%

Year	Pop.	±%
1921	936	+3.9%
1931	924	−1.3%
1936	903	−2.3%
1951	753	−16.6%
1961	580	−23.0%

Year	Pop.	±%
1971	494	−14.8%
1981	447	−9.5%
1991	428	−4.3%
2001	419	−2.1%

Source: Data from ISTAT
