= Loazzolo =

- Comune
- Comune di Loazzolo
- Coat of arms

- Location within Italy Location within Piedmont
- Coordinates: 44°40′N 8°16′E
- Country: Italy
- Region: Piedmont
- Province: Asti (AT)

Government
  - Mayor: Oscar Grea

Area
  - Total: 15.5 km^{2} (6.0 sq mi)
- Elevation: 430 m (1,410 ft)

Population (1 January 2010)
  - Total: 343
  - Density: 22.1/km^{2} (57.3/sq mi)
- Demonym: Loazzolesi
- Time zone: UTC+1 (CET)
  - Summer (DST): UTC+2 (CEST)
- Postal code: 14050
- Dialing code: 0144
- Website: Official website

Loazzolo is a comune (municipality) in the Province of Asti in the Italian region Piedmont (Regione Piemonte), located about 60 kilometres (37 mi) southeast of Turin and about 25 kilometres (16 mi) south of Asti.

Loazzolo borders the following municipalities: Bubbio, Canelli, Cessole, Cossano Belbo, Monastero Bormida, Roccaverano, and Santo Stefano Belbo.

A local wine, Loazzolo, is a two-year aged golden sweet yellow wine is produced in the municipality of Loazzolo with grapes from Moscato vineyards.
