= Barbaresco Castle =

- Castello di Barbaresco
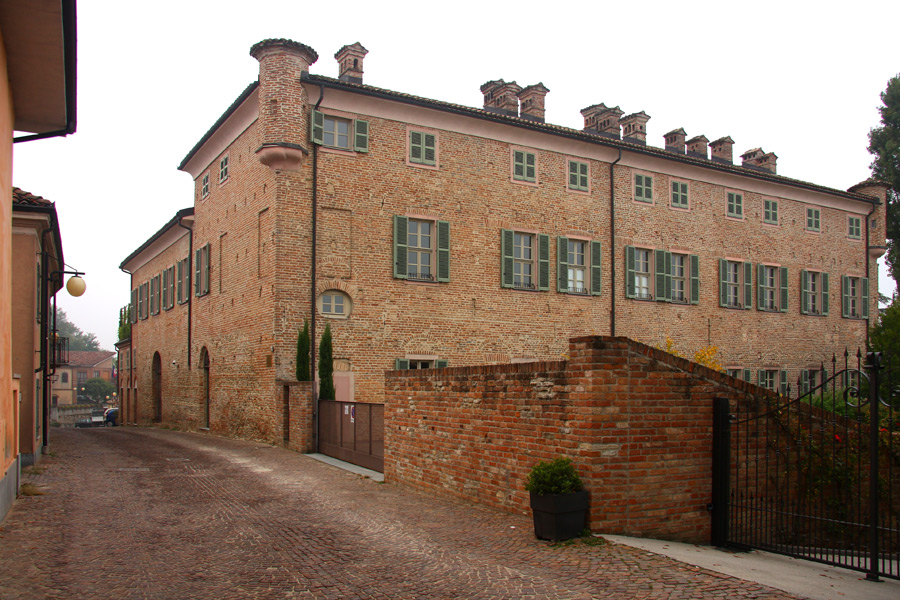
- Barbaresco Castle in 2010
- Click on the map for a fullscreen view

General information
- Location: Barbaresco, Italy
- Coordinates: 44°43′33.96″N 8°04′49.62″E

Barbaresco Castle (Italian: Castello di Barbaresco), also known as Palazzo Galleani, is a castle located in Barbaresco, Piedmont, Italy.

== History ==
After belonging to the Marquises of Montferrat and the Visconti, the castle, along with the nearby Barbaresco Tower, eventually passed to the House of Savoy in 1631.

Falling into disrepair, the castle was completely renovated during the Baroque period, taking on the appearance of a grand noble residence, except for the still-visible corner turrets that characterize it— the last remaining trace of its former military function.
