= Enrico Scarampi =

Italian churchman

Beato Enrico Scarampi (died 1440) was an Italian churchman from the prominent Scarampi family of the area of Asti, active at the time of the Western Schism.

Born to Oddone, or Oddonino Scarampi, signore of Cortemiglia, Enrico Scarampi appears in the historical record in 1396 as Bishop of Acqui. In 1406 he became Bishop of Feltre e Belluno. He participated in the Conclave of 1417 that elected Cardinal Oddone Colonna to the papacy. Colonna, as Pope Martin V, made him treasurer of the Camera Apostolica. He was one of the fourteen members of the reform committee of the Council of Constance (1414-1418), where he supported the principle of Papal supremacy over Councilarism, and was also the spiritual director of the beata Margherita di Savoia-Acaia.

Enrico Scarampi died in 1440.
