= Serole =

- Comune
- Comune di Serole
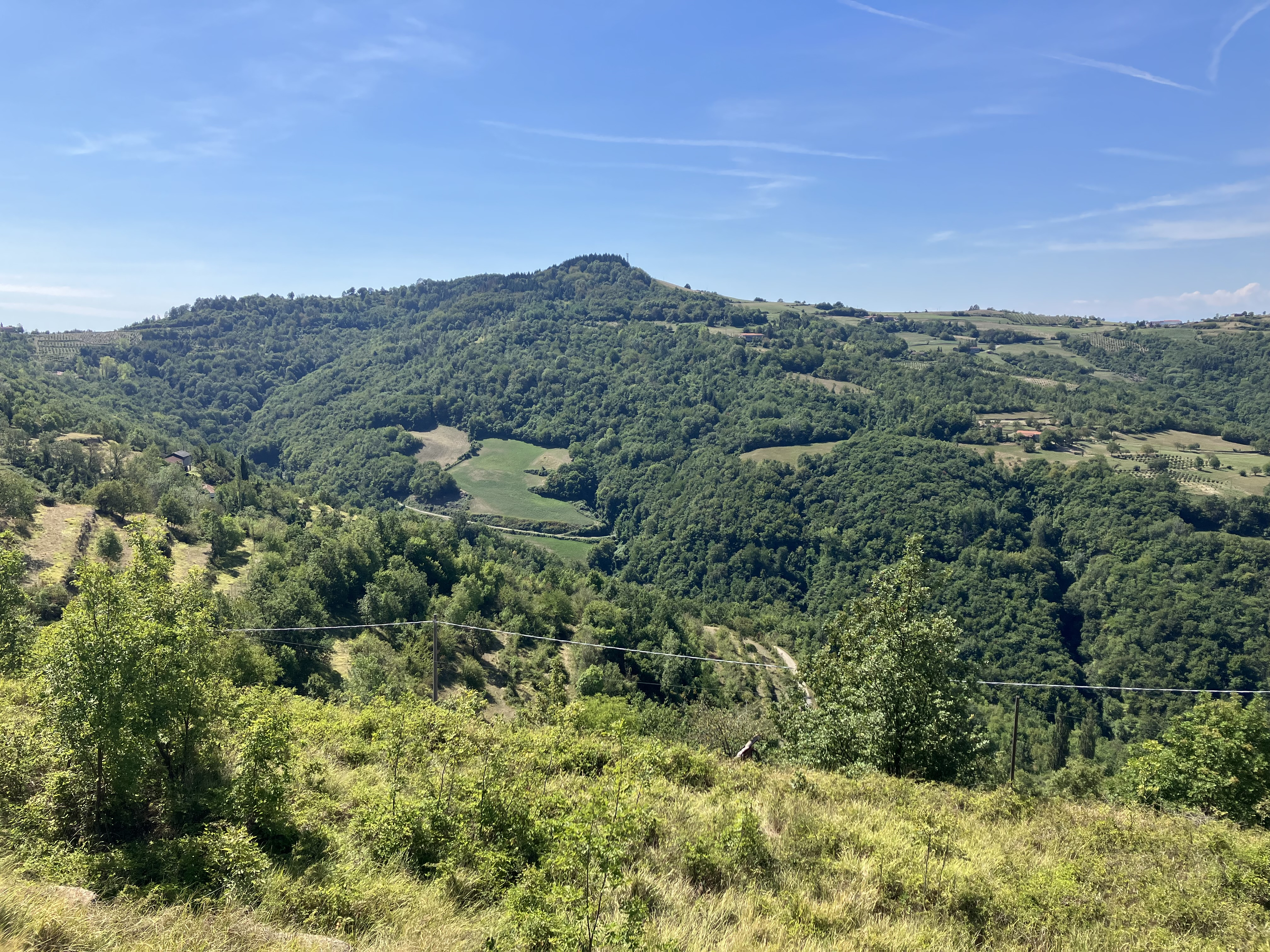

- Location within Italy Location within Piedmont
- Coordinates: 44°33′N 8°16′E
- Country: Italy
- Region: Piedmont
- Province: Province of Asti (AT)
- Frazioni: Cuniola

Area
  - Total: 11.8 km^{2} (4.6 sq mi)

Population (Dec. 2004)
  - Total: 166
  - Density: 14.1/km^{2} (36.4/sq mi)
- Time zone: UTC+1 (CET)
  - Summer (DST): UTC+2 (CEST)
- Postal code: 14050
- Dialing code: 0144
- Website: Official website

Serole is a comune (municipality) in the Province of Asti in the Italian region Piedmont, located about 70 kilometres (43 mi) southeast of Turin and about 40 kilometres (25 mi) south of Asti. As of 31 December 2004, it had a population of 166 and an area of 11.8 square kilometres (4.6 mi^{2}).

Serole borders the following municipalities: Cortemilia, Merana, Olmo Gentile, Perletto, Pezzolo Valle Uzzone, Piana Crixia, Roccaverano, and Spigno Monferrato.

== Demographic evolution ==
Historical population

Year	Pop.	±%
1861	586	—
1871	627	+7.0%
1881	599	−4.5%
1901	698	+16.5%
1911	599	−14.2%

Year	Pop.	±%
1921	636	+6.2%
1931	588	−7.5%
1936	595	+1.2%
1951	469	−21.2%
1961	268	−42.9%

Year	Pop.	±%
1971	214	−20.1%
1981	197	−7.9%
1991	189	−4.1%
2001	163	−13.8%

Source: Data from ISTAT
