= Olmo Gentile =

- Comune
- Comune di Olmo Gentile
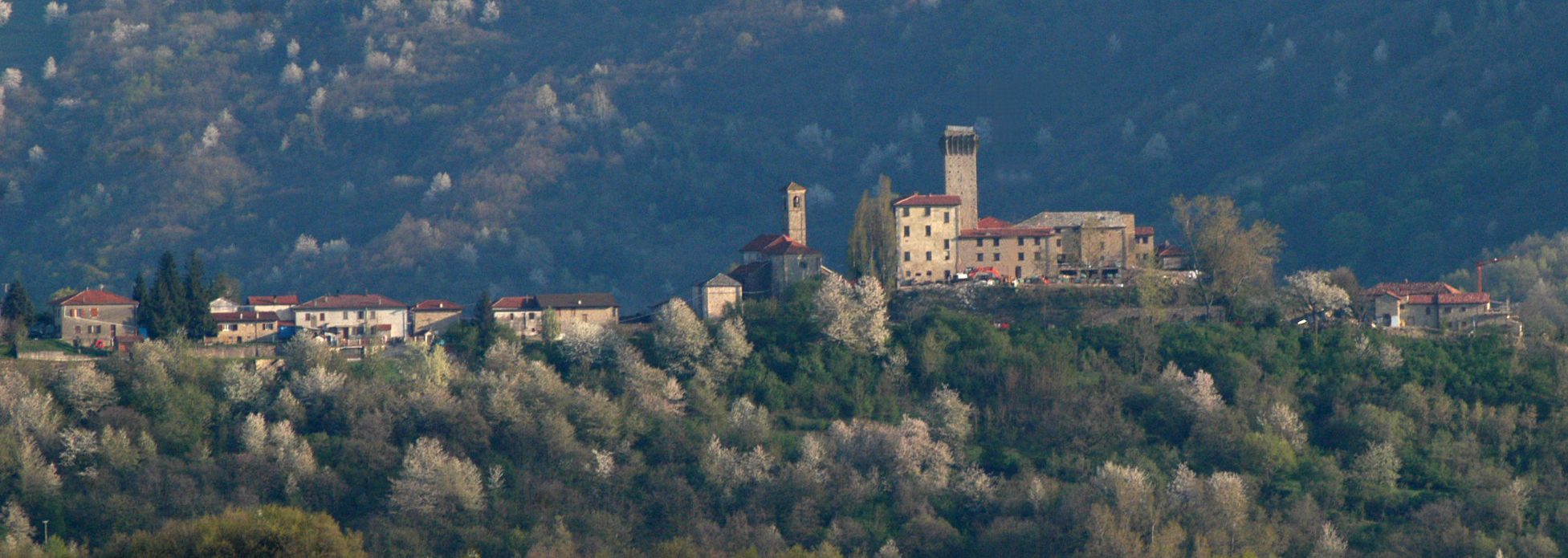

- Coat of arms

- Location within Italy Location within Piedmont
- Coordinates: 44°35′N 8°15′E
- Country: Italy
- Region: Piedmont
- Province: Asti (AT)

Government
  - Mayor: Maria Grazia Aramini

Area
  - Total: 5.1 km^{2} (2.0 sq mi)
- Elevation: 615 m (2,018 ft)

Population (31 July 2010)
  - Total: 93
  - Density: 18/km^{2} (47/sq mi)
- Demonym: Olmesi
- Time zone: UTC+1 (CET)
  - Summer (DST): UTC+2 (CEST)
- Postal code: 14050
- Dialing code: 0144
- Website: Official website

Olmo Gentile is a comune (municipality) in the Province of Asti in the Italian region Piedmont, located about 70 kilometres (43 mi) southeast of Turin and about 35 kilometres (22 mi) south of Asti.

Olmo Gentile borders Perletto, Roccaverano, San Giorgio Scarampi, and Serole.
