= Perletto =

- Comune
- Comune di Perletto
- Location within Italy Location within Piedmont
- Coordinates: 44°36′N 8°13′E
- Country: Italy
- Region: Piedmont
- Province: Cuneo (CN)

Area
  - Total: 0.17 km^{2} (0.066 sq mi)
- Highest elevation: 453 m (1,486 ft)
- Lowest elevation: 434 m (1,424 ft)

Population (31 May 2007)
  - Total: 311
  - Density: 1,800/km^{2} (4,700/sq mi)
- Demonym: Perlettesi
- Time zone: UTC+1 (CET)
  - Summer (DST): UTC+2 (CEST)
- Postal code: 12070
- Dialing code: 0173
- Patron saint: Victor Maurus
- Saint day: 8 May
- Website: Official website

Perletto is a comune (municipality) in the Province of Cuneo in the Italian region Piedmont, located about 65.93 kilometres (40.97 mi) southeast of Turin and about 58.18 kilometres (36.15 mi) northeast of Cuneo.

== Geography ==
As of 31 December 2004, it had a population of 321 and an area of 10.5 square kilometres (4.1 mi^{2}). Perletto borders the following municipalities: Castino, Cortemilia, Olmo Gentile, San Giorgio Scarampi, Serole, and Vesime.

== Demographic evolution ==
Historical population

Year	Pop.	±%
1861	828	—
1871	853	+3.0%
1881	805	−5.6%
1901	958	+19.0%
1911	883	−7.8%

Year	Pop.	±%
1921	881	−0.2%
1931	938	+6.5%
1936	929	−1.0%
1951	780	−16.0%
1961	567	−27.3%

Year	Pop.	±%
1971	459	−19.0%
1981	413	−10.0%
1991	337	−18.4%
2001	328	−2.7%

Source: Data from ISTAT
