= Asili, Barbaresco =

Human settlement in Italy

Asili is a cru in the commune of Barbaresco, in Piedmont, Italy, with widespread recognition for its terroir and its quality. It has ancient roots and has been claimed that the name derives from Latin and is associated with a place of "asylum".

It is 14 hectares in size and located in the centre of the commune, occupying the crest of the Asili hill with vineyards on all sides, with the tiny hamlet of Asili near the crest, southwest of the peak. The vines on the southwestern aspect are particularly well-oriented, lying just to the east of the Borgata Asili.

Asili is located at a modest altitude (200–280m) for Barbaresco, and is accordingly relatively warm. The variety of soil—silt, loam and clay—is thought to be responsible for the wine's finesse. Prominent winemaker Michele Chiarlo has claimed that the richness in magnesium and calcium are significant too. It has recently taken over a neighboring part of Rabajà.

The Bruno Giacosa Asili has been considered a "reference point" for all of Barbaresco in the words of the wine critic Robert Parker.

== Producers ==
- Bruno Giacosa
- Cà del Baio
- Cascina Liusin
- Ceretto
- Michele Chiarlo
- Gaja
- Carlo Giacosa
- Luigi Giodano
- Produttori del Barbaresco
- Roagna - I Paglieri
- Privati
