= Treiso =

- Comune
- Comune di Treiso
- Location within Italy Location within Piedmont
- Coordinates: 44°41′N 8°5′E
- Country: Italy
- Region: Piedmont
- Province: Province of Cuneo (CN)

Area
  - Total: 9.5 km^{2} (3.7 sq mi)
- Elevation: 410 m (1,350 ft)

Population (Dec. 2004)
  - Total: 764
  - Density: 80/km^{2} (210/sq mi)
- Time zone: UTC+1 (CET)
  - Summer (DST): UTC+2 (CEST)
- Postal code: 12050
- Dialing code: 0173

Treiso is a comune (municipality) in the Province of Cuneo in the Italian region Piedmont, located about 50 kilometres (31 mi) southeast of Turin and about 50 kilometres northeast of Cuneo. As of 31 December 2004, it had a population of 764 and an area of 9.5 square kilometres (3.7 mi^{2}).

Treiso borders the following municipalities: Alba, Barbaresco, Neive, Neviglie, and Trezzo Tinella.

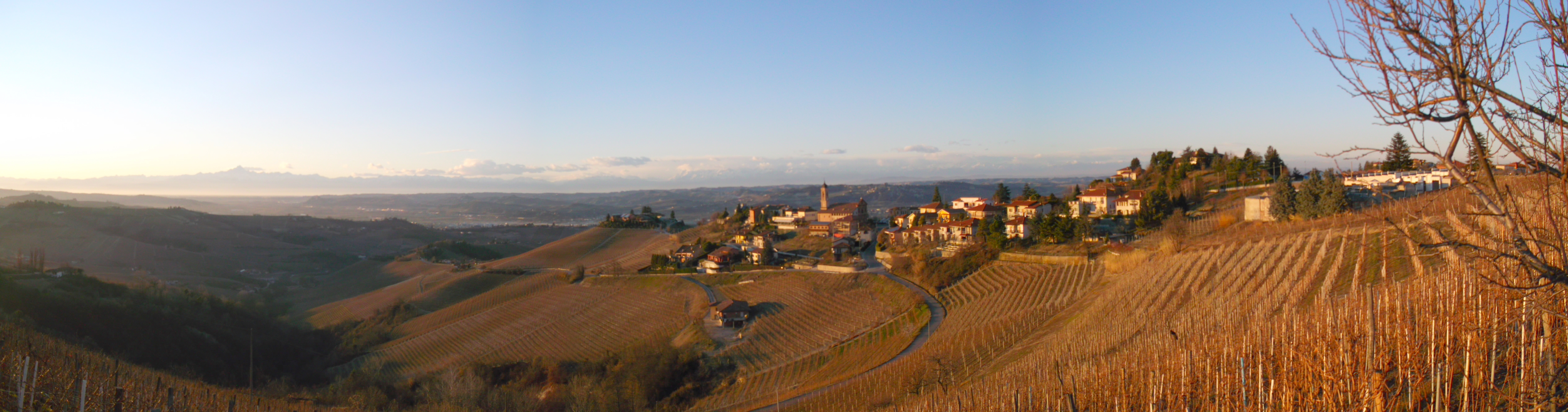
Panoramic view over Treiso and Langhe on a winter's day

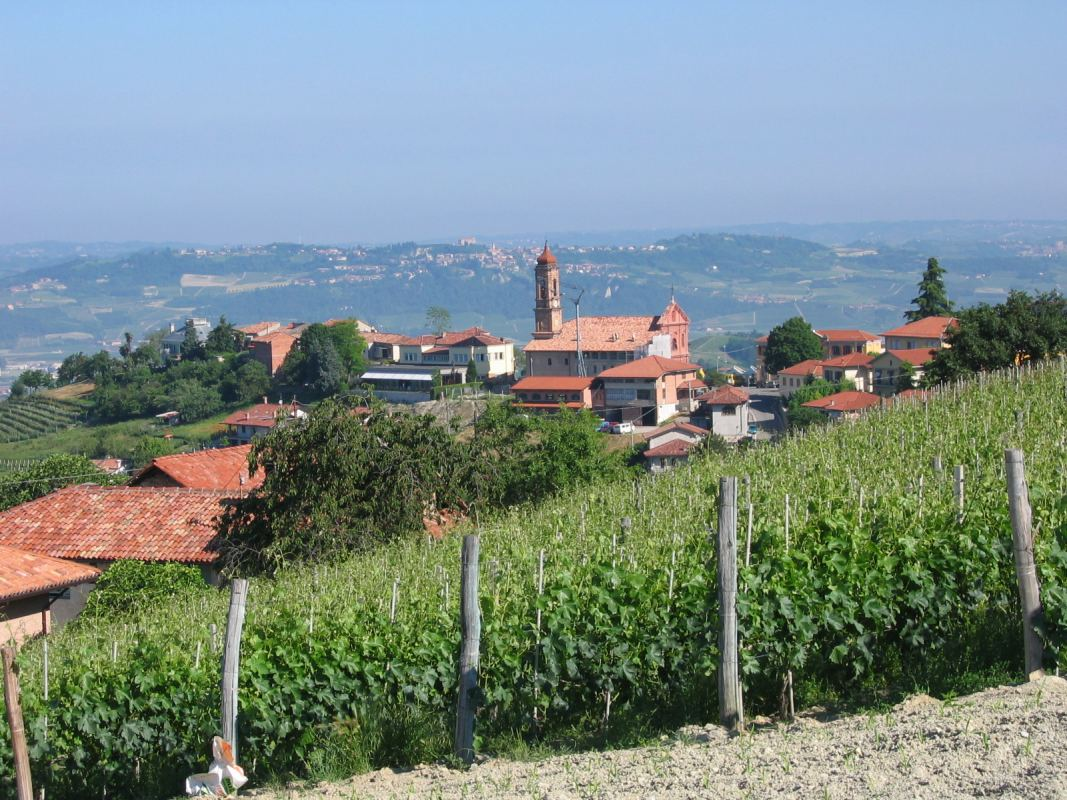
Treiso lies within the Barbaresco wine-making zone

== Demographic evolution ==
Historical population

Year	Pop.	±%
1861	678	—
1871	801	+18.1%
1881	843	+5.2%
1901	998	+18.4%
1911	1,106	+10.8%

Year	Pop.	±%
1921	1,107	+0.1%
1931	1,084	−2.1%
1936	1,090	+0.6%
1951	921	−15.5%
1961	761	−17.4%

Year	Pop.	±%
1971	707	−7.1%
1981	701	−0.8%
1991	709	+1.1%
2001	763	+7.6%

Source: Data from ISTAT
