= Grinzane Cavour =

- Comune
- Comune di Grinzane Cavour
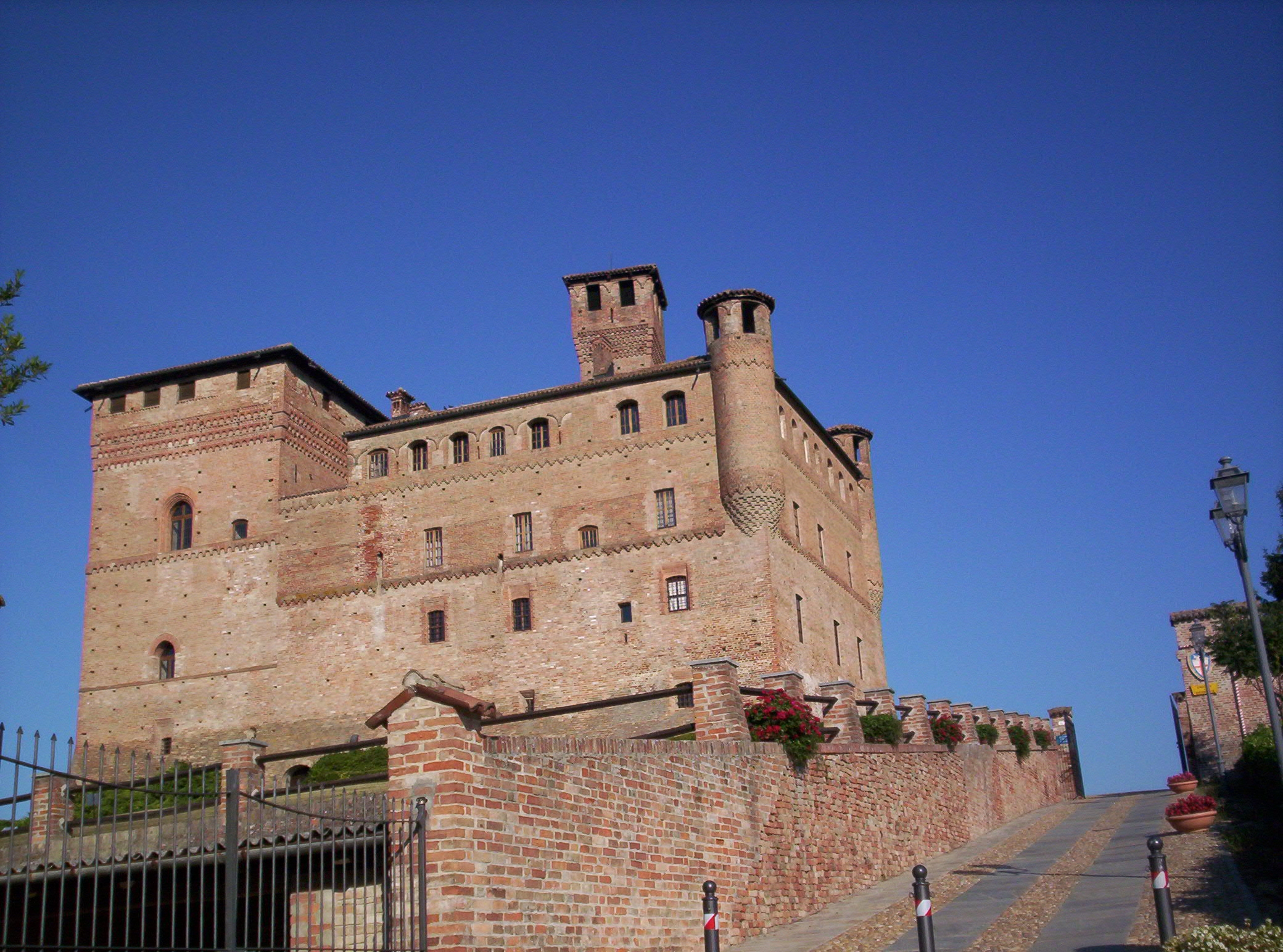

- Coat of arms

- Location within Italy Location within Piedmont
- Coordinates: 44°40′N 7°59′E
- Country: Italy
- Region: Piedmont
- Province: Cuneo (CN)
- Frazioni: Barzone, Gallo, Giacco, Grinzane

Government
  - Mayor: Franco Sampò

Area
  - Total: 3.7 km^{2} (1.4 sq mi)
- Elevation: 195 m (640 ft)

Population (31 August 2017)
  - Total: 1,987
  - Density: 540/km^{2} (1,400/sq mi)
- Demonym: Grinzanesi or Gallesi
- Time zone: UTC+1 (CET)
  - Summer (DST): UTC+2 (CEST)
- Postal code: 12060
- Dialing code: 0173
- Website: Official website

Grinzane Cavour is a comune (municipality) in the Province of Cuneo in the Italian region Piedmont, located about 50 kilometres (31 mi) southeast of Turin and about 45 kilometres (28 mi) northeast of Cuneo.

Grinzane Cavour borders the municipalities of Alba and Diano d'Alba.

Originally simply known as Grinzane, it switched to the current name in homage to Camillo Benso, Count Cavour, who was mayor of the city for 17 years.

The main attraction is the massive medieval castle. Until 2009, Grinzane Cavour was also the seat of the eponymous literary award.

== Twin towns ==
- Canosa di Puglia, Italy
