= Langhe =

Coordinates: 44.61°N 7.97°E

Vineyard Landscape of Piedmont: Langhe
UNESCO World Heritage Site
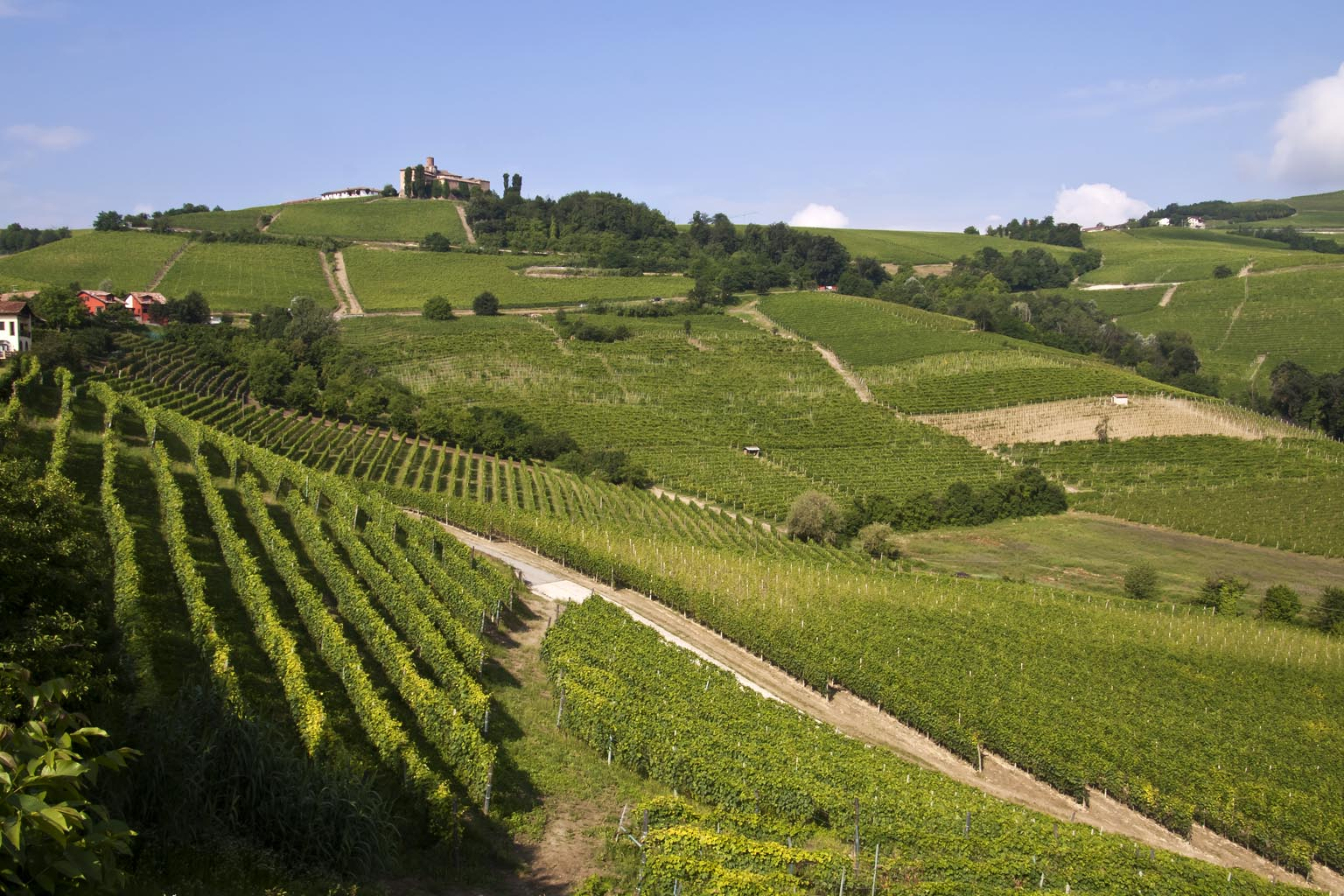
- Interactive map of Vineyard Landscape of Piedmont: Langhe
- Location: Province of Cuneo, Piedmont, Italy
- Part of: Vineyard Landscape of Piedmont: Langhe-Roero and Monferrato
- Includes: 1. Langa of Barolo; 2. Grinzane Cavour Castle; 3. Hills of Barbaresco
- Criteria: Cultural: (iii), (v)
- Reference: 1390rev
- Inscription: 2014 (38th Session)

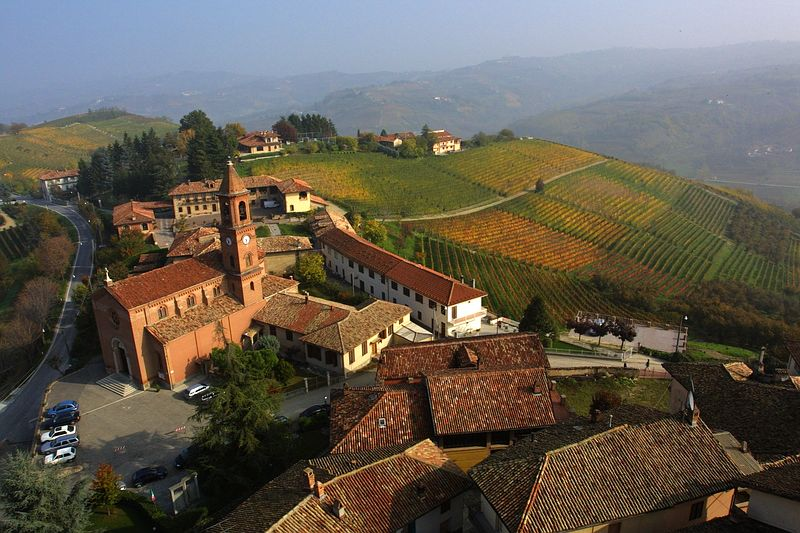
Serralunga d’Alba and its vineyards

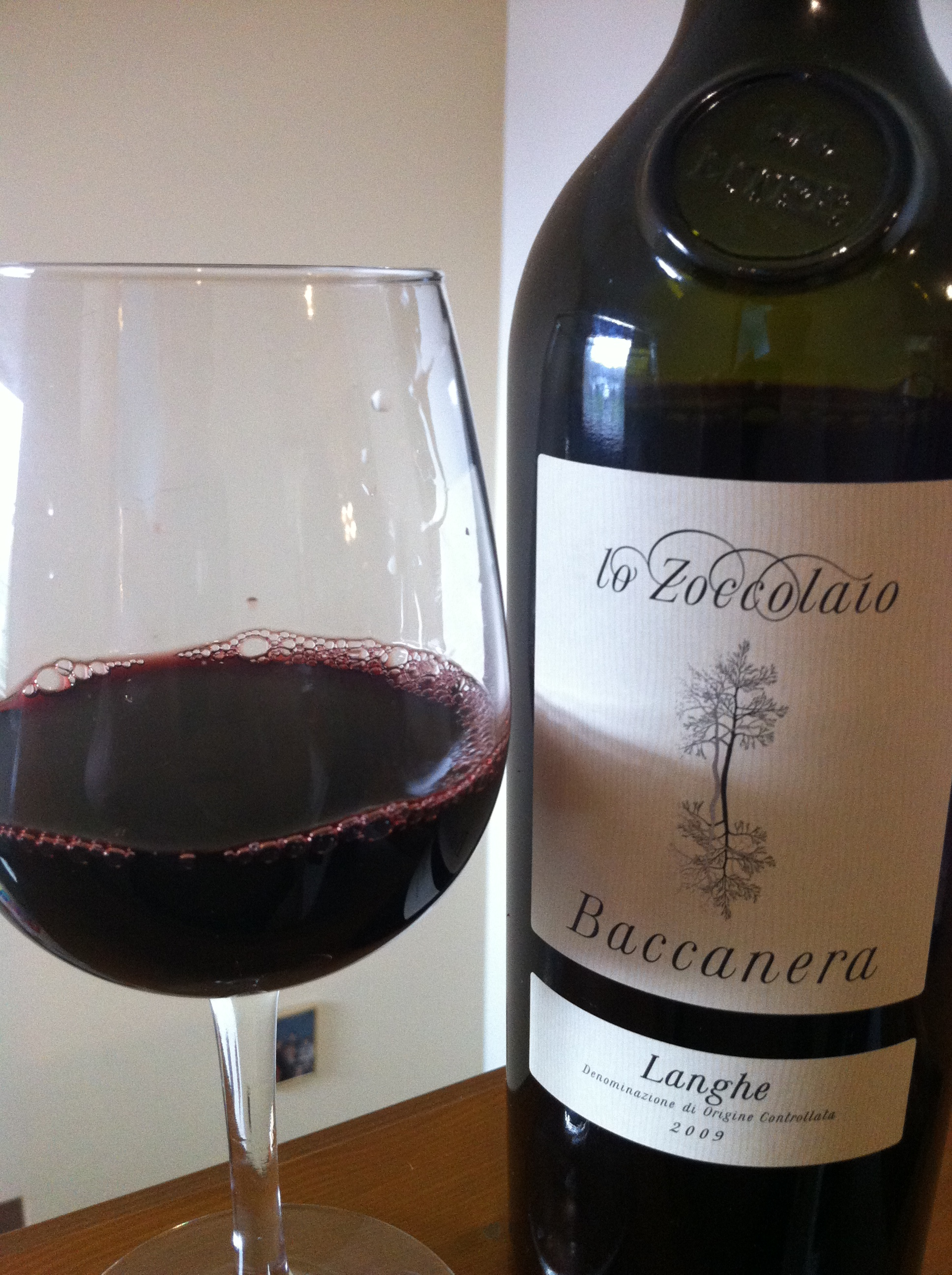
A Cabernet Sauvignon/Barbera blend from the Langhe DOC

The Langhe (Italian: [ˈlaŋɡe], Piedmontese: [ˈlɑŋɡe]; Latin: Mons Langa et Bassa Langa), usually Langa when referring to each of its subdivisions, is a historical hilly area to the south and east of the river Tanaro in the provinces of Cuneo and Asti in Piedmont, northern Italy.

It is famous for its wines, cheeses, and truffles—particularly the white truffles of Alba. The countryside as it was in the first half of the 20th century features prominently in the writings of Beppe Fenoglio and Cesare Pavese, who was born there, in Santo Stefano Belbo.

On 22 June 2014, a part of the Langhe was inscribed on UNESCO's World Heritage list for its cultural landscapes, an outstanding living testimony to winegrowing and winemaking traditions that stem from a long history, and that have been continuously improved and adapted up to the present day. They bear witness to an extremely comprehensive social, rural and urban realm, and to sustainable economic structures. They include a multitude of harmoniously built elements that bear witness to its history and its professional practices.

Its vineyards constitute an outstanding example of man’s interaction with his natural environment. Following a long and slow evolution of winegrowing expertise, the best possible adaptation of grape varieties to land with specific soil and climatic components has been carried out, which in itself is related to winemaking expertise, thereby becoming an international benchmark. The winegrowing landscape also expresses great aesthetic qualities, making it an archetype of European vineyards.

Crutin cheese is made in Langhe.

In geology, the Langhian Age of the Miocene Epoch is named for the Langhe region.

== Viticulture ==
DOC and DOCG wines produced in this area include:

- Arneis
- Barbera d'Alba
- Barolo
- Barbaresco
- Dolcetto d'Alba
- Dogliani
- Dolcetto delle Langhe Monregalesi
- Dolcetto delle Langhe Monregalesi superiore
- Langhe Arneis
- Langhe Chardonnay
- Langhe Chardonnay Vigna
- Langhe Dolcetto
- Langhe Favorita
- Langhe Favorita Vigna
- Langhe Freisa
- Langhe Freisa Vigna
- Langhe Nascetta
- Langhe Nebbiolo
- Langhe bianco
- Langhe rosso

== In popular culture ==
Langhe is the setting for PC Game Hundred Days - Winemaking Simulator.
