= Cessole =

- Comune
- Comune di Cessole
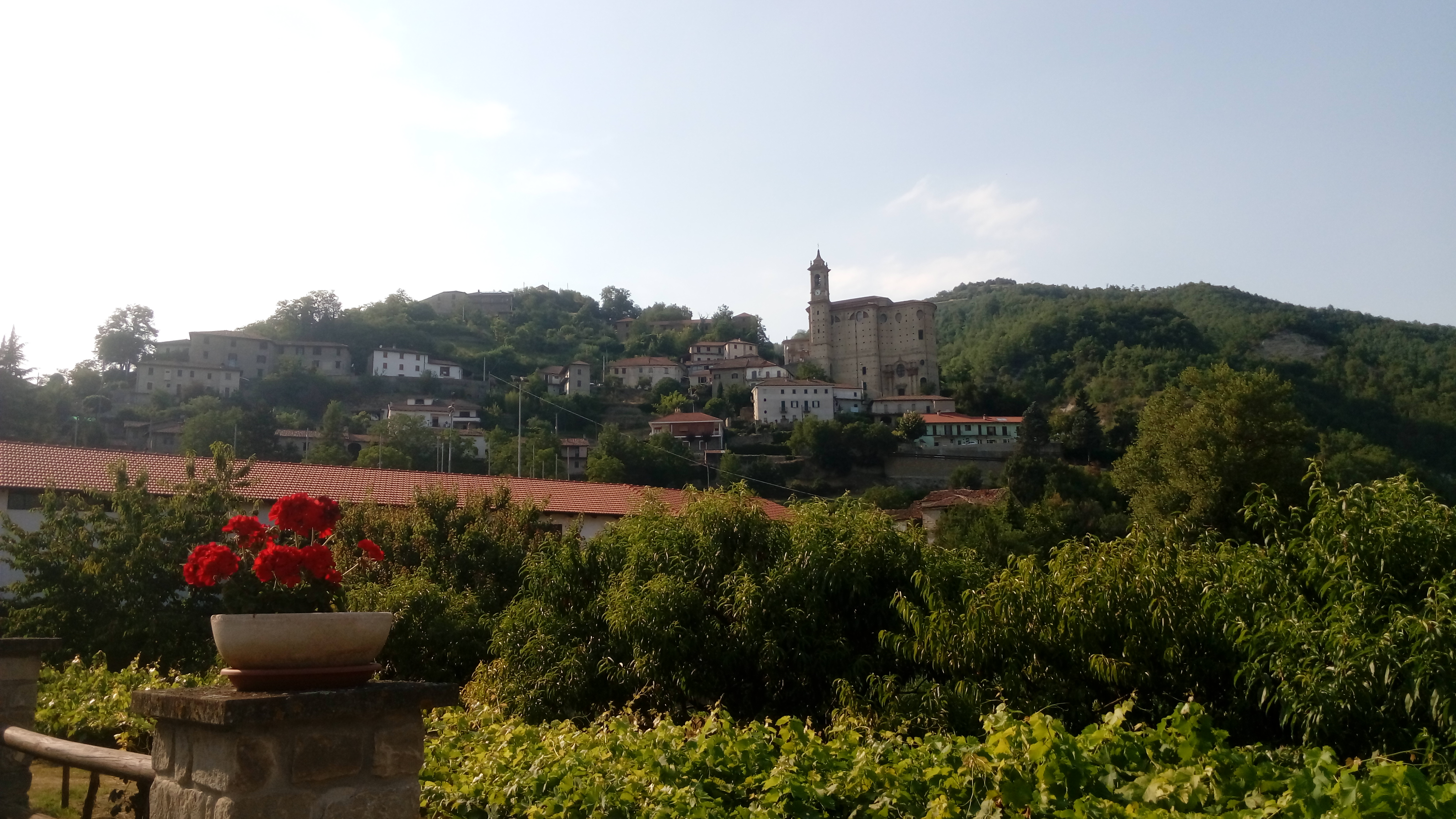
- View of Cessole

- Location within Italy Location within Piedmont
- Coordinates: 44°39′N 8°15′E
- Country: Italy
- Region: Piedmont
- Province: Asti (AT)

Government
  - Mayor: Alessandro Francesco Innocente Degemi

Area
  - Total: 11.78 km^{2} (4.55 sq mi)
- Elevation: 280 m (920 ft)

Population (30 June 2017)
  - Total: 399
  - Density: 33.9/km^{2} (87.7/sq mi)
- Demonym: Cessolesi
- Time zone: UTC+1 (CET)
  - Summer (DST): UTC+2 (CEST)
- Postal code: 14050
- Dialing code: 0144
- Website: Official website

Cessole is a comune (municipality) in the Province of Asti in the Italian region Piedmont, located about 60 kilometres (37 mi) southeast of Turin and about 30 kilometres (19 mi) south of Asti.

Cessole borders the following municipalities: Bubbio, Cossano Belbo, Loazzolo, Roccaverano, and Vesime.
