= Roccaverano =

- Comune
- Comune di Roccaverano
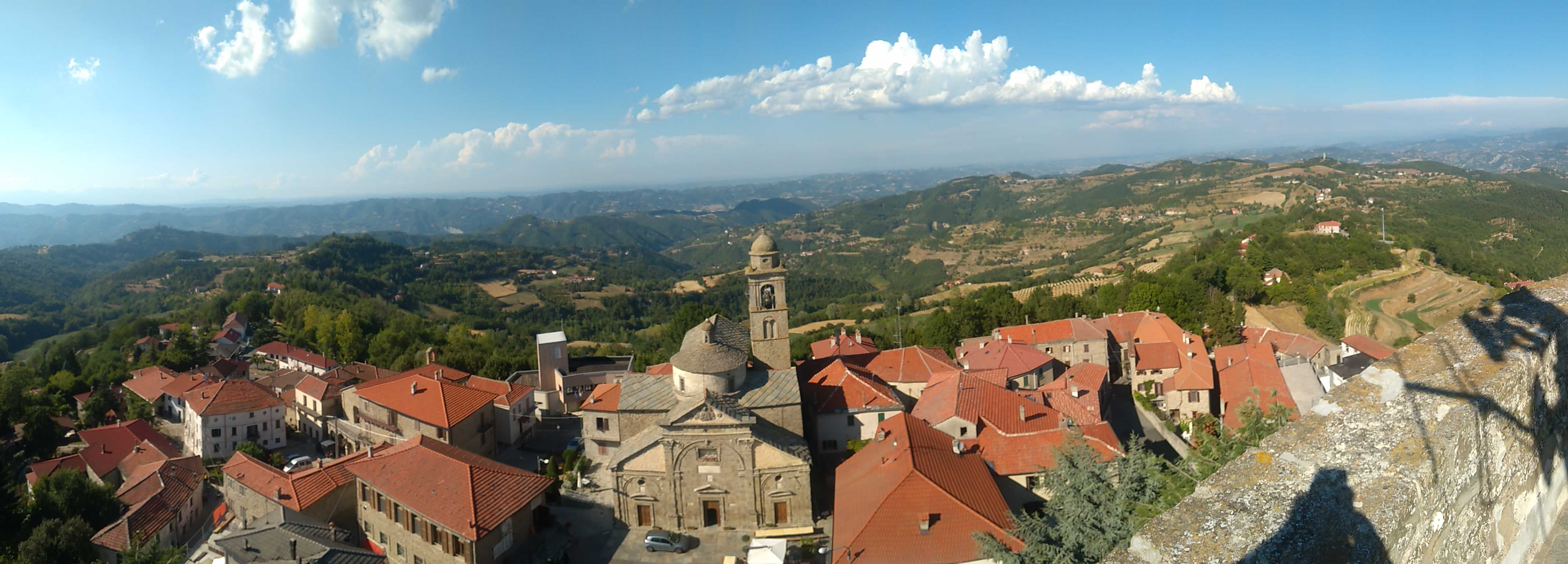

- Location within Italy Location within Piedmont
- Coordinates: 44°36′N 8°16′E
- Country: Italy
- Region: Piedmont
- Province: Asti (AT)

Government
  - Mayor: Fabio Vergellato

Area
  - Total: 29.9 km^{2} (11.5 sq mi)
- Elevation: 759 m (2,490 ft)

Population (30 November 2016)
  - Total: 473
  - Density: 15.8/km^{2} (41.0/sq mi)
- Demonym: Roccaveranesi
- Time zone: UTC+1 (CET)
  - Summer (DST): UTC+2 (CEST)
- Postal code: 14050
- Dialing code: 0144
- Website: Official website

Roccaverano is a comune (municipality) in the Province of Asti in the Italian region Piedmont, located about 70 kilometres (43 mi) southeast of Turin and about 35 kilometres (22 mi) south of Asti.

Roccaverano borders the following municipalities: Bubbio, Cessole, Denice, Loazzolo, Mombaldone, Monastero Bormida, Olmo Gentile, San Giorgio Scarampi, Serole, Spigno Monferrato, and Vesime.

Landscape of Roccaverano from the tower
