= Bubbio =

- Comune
- Comune di Bubbio
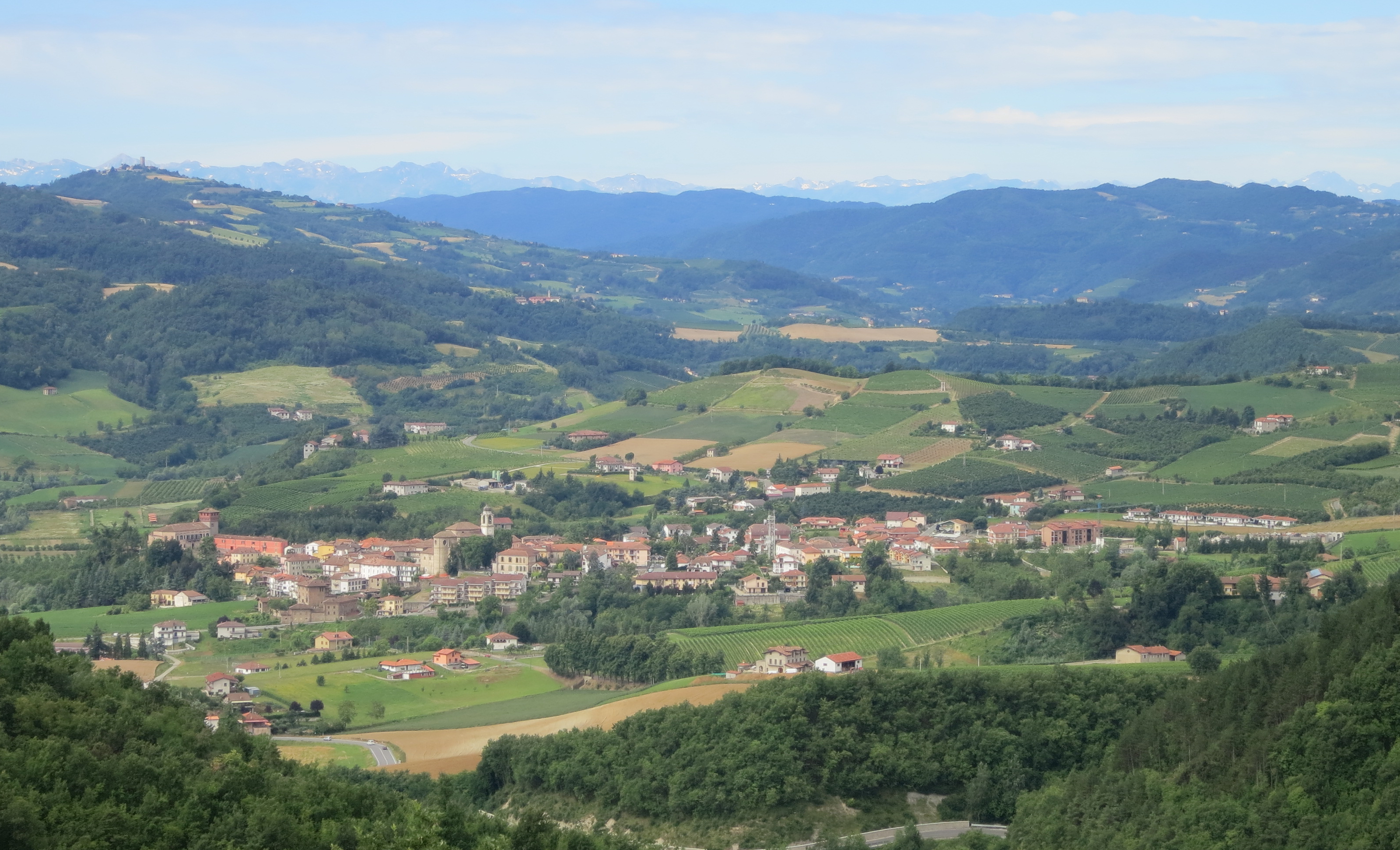
- View of Bubbio

- Coat of arms

- Location within Italy Location within Piedmont
- Coordinates: 44°40′N 8°18′E
- Country: Italy
- Region: Piedmont
- Province: Asti (AT)

Government
  - Mayor: Stefano Reggio

Area
  - Total: 15.7 km^{2} (6.1 sq mi)
- Elevation: 224 m (735 ft)

Population (3 December 2010)
  - Total: 919
  - Density: 58.5/km^{2} (152/sq mi)
- Demonym: Bubbiesi
- Time zone: UTC+1 (CET)
  - Summer (DST): UTC+2 (CEST)
- Postal code: 14051
- Dialing code: 0144
- Website: Official website

Bubbio is a comune (municipality) in the Province of Asti in the Italian region Piedmont, located about 60 kilometres (37 mi) southeast of Turin and about 25 kilometres (16 mi) southeast of Asti.

Bubbio borders the following municipalities: Canelli, Cassinasco, Cessole, Loazzolo, Monastero Bormida, and Roccaverano.
