= San Giorgio Scarampi =

- Comune
- Comune di San Giorgio Scarampi
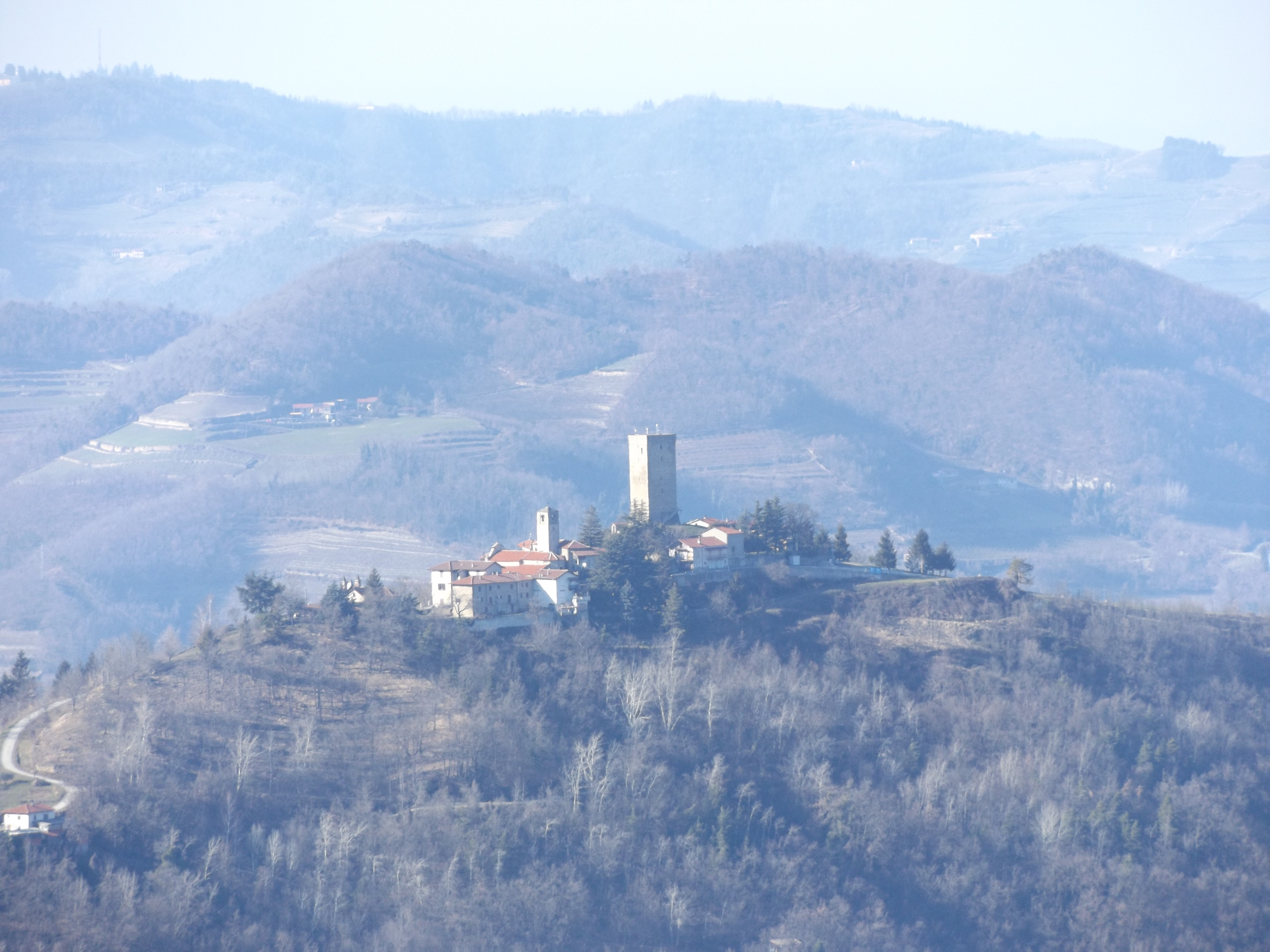

- Coat of arms

- Location within Italy Location within Piedmont
- Coordinates: 44°37′N 8°15′E
- Country: Italy
- Region: Piedmont
- Province: Asti (AT)

Government
  - Mayor: Alessandro Boffa

Area
  - Total: 6.0 km^{2} (2.3 sq mi)
- Elevation: 655 m (2,149 ft)

Population (31 May 2007)
  - Total: 122
  - Density: 20/km^{2} (53/sq mi)
- Demonym: Sangiorgesi
- Time zone: UTC+1 (CET)
  - Summer (DST): UTC+2 (CEST)
- Postal code: 14059
- Dialing code: 0144
- Website: Official website

San Giorgio Scarampi is a comune (municipality) in the Province of Asti in the Italian region Piedmont, located about 70 kilometres (43 mi) southeast of Turin and about 30 kilometres (19 mi) south of Asti.

San Giorgio Scarampi borders the following municipalities: Olmo Gentile, Perletto, Roccaverano, and Vesime. It is home to a tall medieval tower, with six floors, commanding the Val Bormida landscape.
