= Castagnole delle Lanze =

Castagnole delle Lanze Castagnòle Lanse
- Comune
- Comune di Castagnole delle Lanze
- View of Castagnole delle Lanze

- Coat of arms

- Location within Italy Location within Piedmont
- Coordinates: 44°45′N 8°9′E
- Country: Italy
- Region: Piedmont
- Province: Province of Asti (AT)
- Frazioni: Annunziata, Carossi, Farinere, Olmo, Rivella, San Bartolomeo, San Grato, San Defendente, San Rocco, San Pietro, Santa Maria, Valle Tanaro, Val Bera

Area
  - Total: 21.4 km^{2} (8.3 sq mi)

Population (Dec. 2004)
  - Total: 3,711
  - Density: 173/km^{2} (449/sq mi)
- Demonym: Castagnolesi
- Time zone: UTC+1 (CET)
  - Summer (DST): UTC+2 (CEST)
- Postal code: 14054
- Dialing code: 0141
- Website: Official website

Castagnole delle Lanze (Piedmontese: Castagnòle Lanse) is a comune (municipality) in the Province of Asti in the Italian region Piedmont, located about 50 kilometres (31 mi) southeast of Turin and about 15 kilometres (9 mi) south of Asti. As of 31 December 2004, it had a population of 3,711 and an area of 21.4 square kilometres (8.3 mi^{2}).

The municipality of Castagnole delle Lanze contains the frazioni (subdivisions, mainly villages and hamlets) Annunziata, Carossi, Farinere, Olmo, Rivella, San Bartolomeo, San Grato, San Defendente, San Rocco, San Pietro, Santa Maria, Valle Tanaro, and Val Bera.

Castagnole delle Lanze borders the following municipalities: Castiglione Tinella, Coazzolo, Costigliole d'Asti, Govone, Magliano Alfieri, and Neive. It is one of I Borghi più belli d'Italia ("The most beautiful villages of Italy").

== Demographic evolution ==
Historical population

Year	Pop.	±%
1861	3,191	—
1871	3,805	+19.2%
1881	4,390	+15.4%
1901	5,411	+23.3%
1911	5,438	+0.5%

Year	Pop.	±%
1921	5,320	−2.2%
1931	4,750	−10.7%
1936	4,325	−8.9%
1951	3,964	−8.3%
1961	3,676	−7.3%

Year	Pop.	±%
1971	3,643	−0.9%
1981	3,513	−3.6%
1991	3,486	−0.8%
2001	3,641	+4.4%

Source: Data from ISTAT

== Twin towns ==
Castagnole delle Lanze is twinned with:

- Brackenheim, Germany
- Charnay-lès-Mâcon, France
- Zbrosławice, Poland
- Tarnalelesz, Hungary
