= Neive =

- Comune
- Comune di Neive
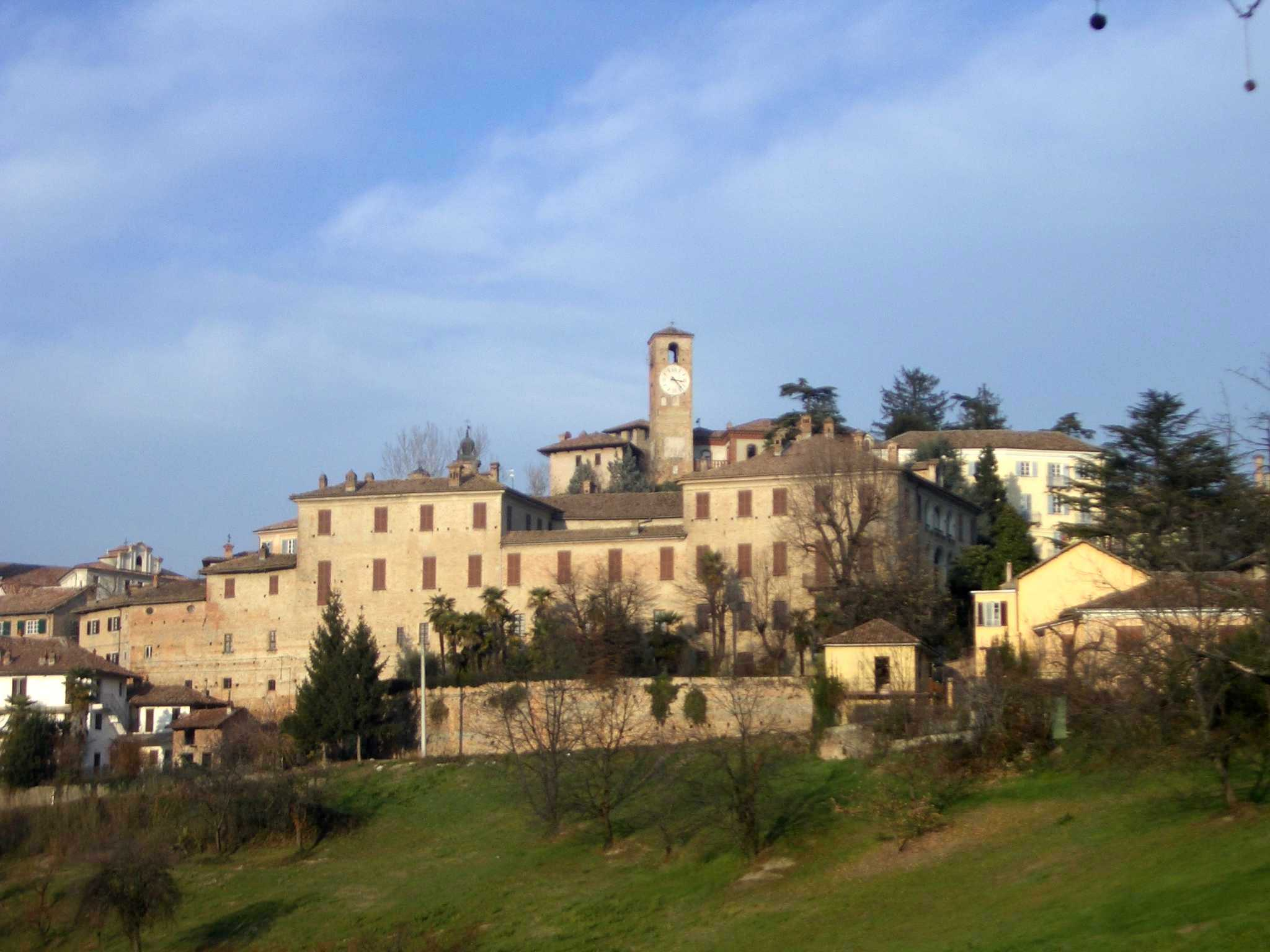

- Coat of arms

- Location within Italy Location within Piedmont
- Coordinates: 44°43′N 8°7′E
- Country: Italy
- Region: Piedmont
- Province: Cuneo (CN)
- Frazioni: Albesani, Balluri, Bordini, Bricco di Neive, Casasse, Cottà, Gallina, Moretta, Pallareta, Pastura, Serraboella, Serracapelli, Starderi

Government
  - Mayor: Piccinelli Paolo

Area
  - Total: 21.2 km^{2} (8.2 sq mi)
- Elevation: 308 m (1,010 ft)

Population (30 November 2017)
  - Total: 3,459
  - Density: 163/km^{2} (423/sq mi)
- Demonym: Neivesi
- Time zone: UTC+1 (CET)
  - Summer (DST): UTC+2 (CEST)
- Postal code: 12052
- Dialing code: 0173
- Patron saint: St. Michael
- Saint day: 29 September
- Website: Official website

Neive is a comune (municipality) in the Province of Cuneo in the Italian region Piedmont, located about 50 kilometres (31 mi) southeast of Turin and about 60 kilometres (37 mi) northeast of Cuneo.

Neive borders the following municipalities: Barbaresco, Castagnito, Castagnole delle Lanze, Coazzolo, Magliano Alfieri, Mango, Neviglie, and Treiso. It is one of I Borghi più belli d'Italia ("The most beautiful villages of Italy").
