= Rocchetta Belbo =

- Comune
- Comune di Rocchetta Belbo
- Coat of arms

- Location within Italy Location within Piedmont
- Coordinates: 44°38′N 8°10′E
- Country: Italy
- Region: Piedmont
- Province: Cuneo (CN)

Government
  - Mayor: Walter Sandri

Area
  - Total: 4.51 km^{2} (1.74 sq mi)
- Elevation: 273 m (896 ft)

Population (31 December 2010)
  - Total: 178
  - Density: 39.5/km^{2} (102/sq mi)
- Demonym: Rocchettesi
- Time zone: UTC+1 (CET)
  - Summer (DST): UTC+2 (CEST)
- Postal code: 12050
- Dialing code: 0141
- Patron saint: St. Anne
- Saint day: July 26
- Website: Official website

Rocchetta Belbo is a comune (municipality) in the Province of Cuneo in the Italian region Piedmont, located about 60 kilometres (37 mi) southeast of Turin and about 60 kilometres northeast of Cuneo.
