= Barbaresco, Piedmont =

Barbaresco
- Comune
- Comune di Barbaresco
- Location within Italy Location within Piedmont
- Coordinates: 44°43′N 8°5′E
- Country: Italy
- Region: Piedmont
- Province: Province of Cuneo (CN)

Area
  - Total: 7.6 km^{2} (2.9 sq mi)

Population (Dec. 2004)
  - Total: 656
  - Density: 86/km^{2} (220/sq mi)
- Time zone: UTC+1 (CET)
  - Summer (DST): UTC+2 (CEST)
- Postal code: 12050
- Dialing code: 0173
- Website: Official website

Barbaresco is a comune (municipality) in the Province of Cuneo in the Italian region Piedmont, located about 50 kilometres (31 mi) southeast of Turin and about 60 kilometres (37 mi) northeast of Cuneo. As of 31 December 2004, it had a population of 656 and an area of 7.6 square kilometres (2.9 mi^{2}). The commune is principally known for its homonymous medieval tower, constructed between the 12th and 14th centuries, Barbaresco Castle, and its production of wine bearing the same name.

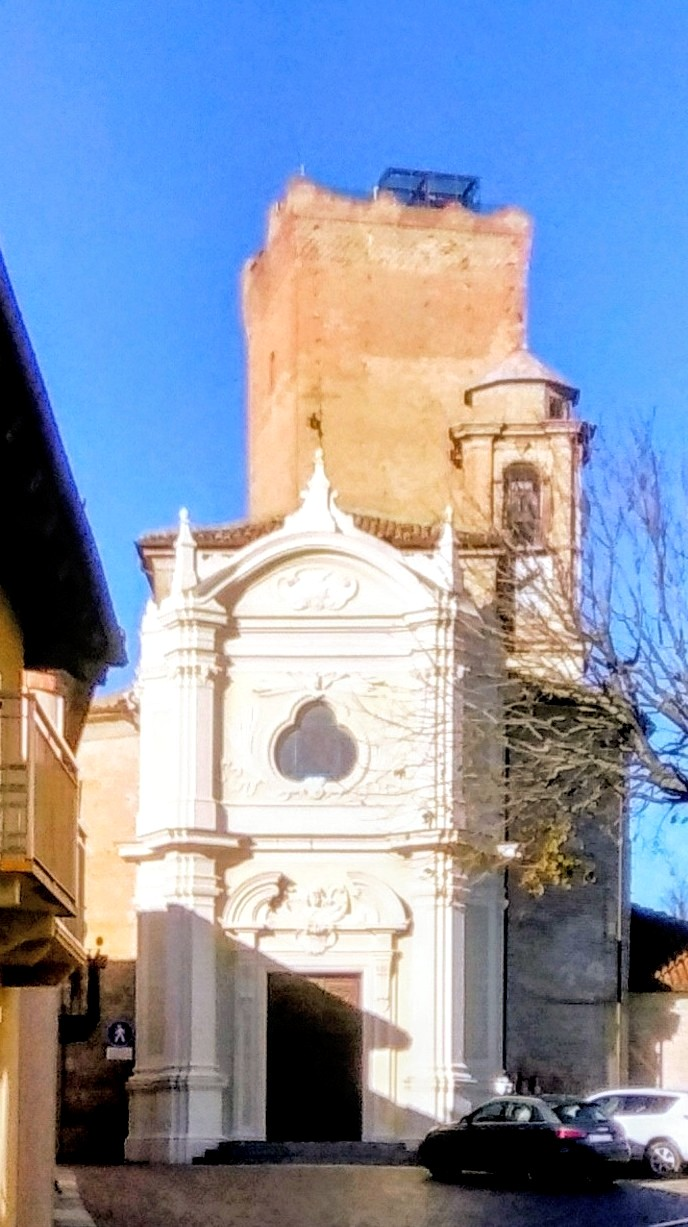
The medieval Barbesco Tower, St John the Baptist church flanked by its 18th century campanile

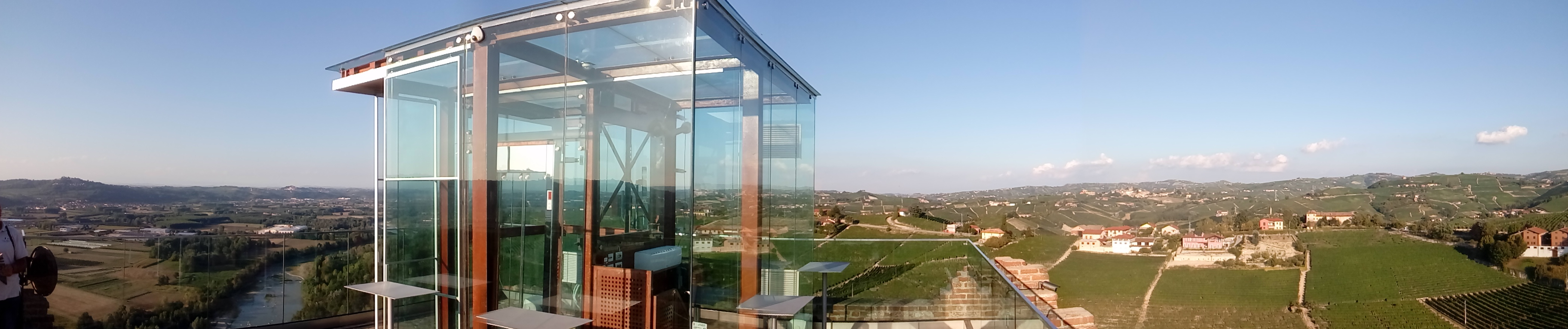
Barbaresco, panoramic view over Langhe and Roero from the tower

Barbaresco borders the following municipalities: Alba, Castagnito, Guarene, Neive, and Treiso.

== Demographic evolution ==
Historical population

Year	Pop.	±%
1861	576	—
1871	680	+18.1%
1881	715	+5.1%
1901	847	+18.5%
1911	939	+10.9%

Year	Pop.	±%
1921	939	+0.0%
1931	921	−1.9%
1936	925	+0.4%
1951	782	−15.5%
1961	617	−21.1%

Year	Pop.	±%
1971	612	−0.8%
1981	637	+4.1%
1991	657	+3.1%
2001	641	−2.4%

Source: Data from ISTAT
