= Santo Stefano Belbo =

- Comune
- Comune di Santo Stefano Belbo
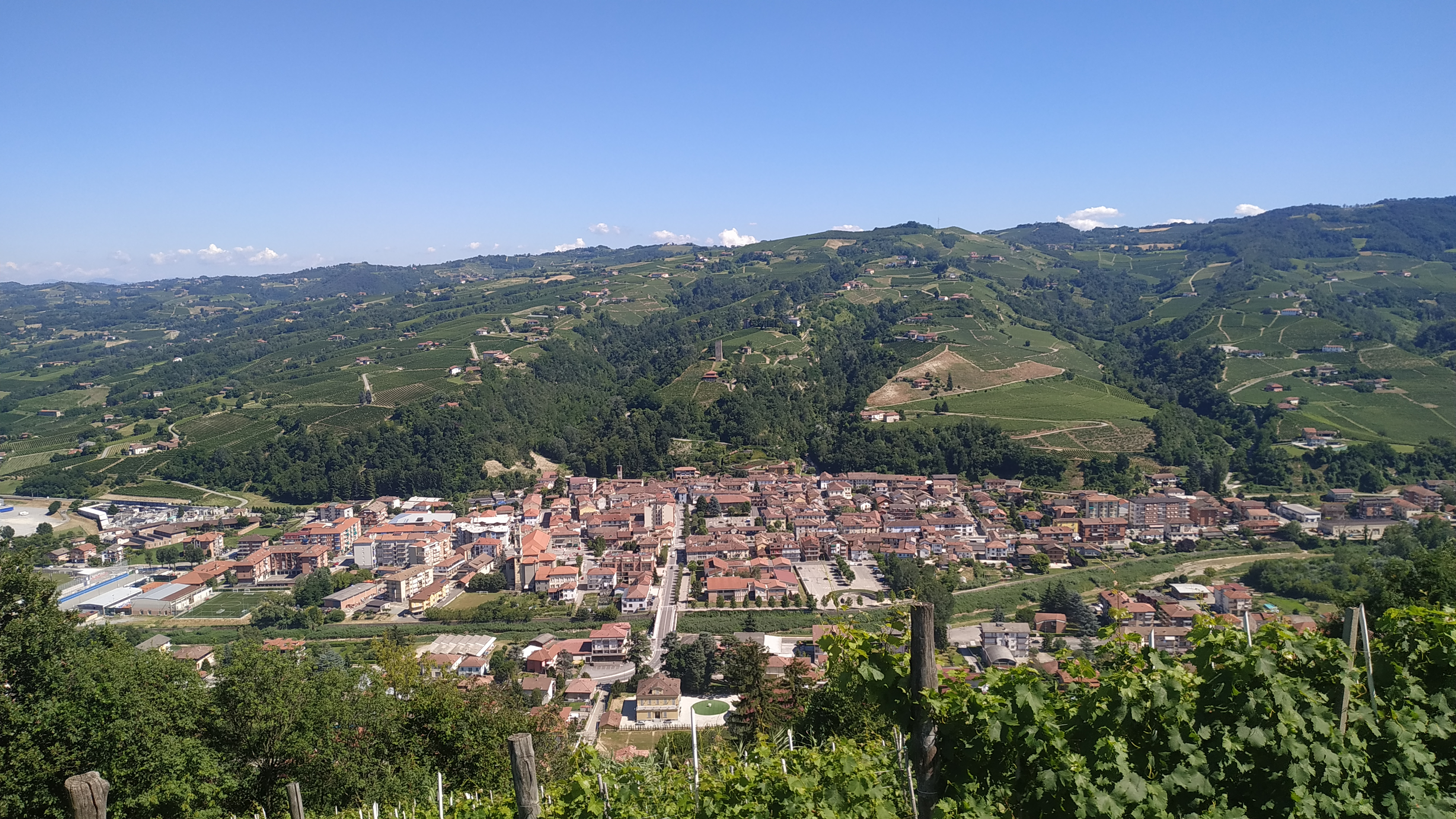

- Location within Italy Location within Piedmont
- Coordinates: 44°42′N 8°14′E
- Country: Italy
- Region: Piedmont
- Province: Cuneo (CN)

Government
  - Mayor: Giuseppe Artuffo

Area
  - Total: 23.6 km^{2} (9.1 sq mi)
- Elevation: 170 m (560 ft)

Population (31 May 2007)
  - Total: 4,055
  - Density: 172/km^{2} (445/sq mi)
- Time zone: UTC+1 (CET)
  - Summer (DST): UTC+2 (CEST)
- Postal code: 12058
- Dialing code: 0141
- Website: Official website

Santo Stefano Belbo is a comune (municipality) in the Province of Cuneo in the Italian region Piedmont, located 60 km (37 mi) southeast of Turin and 60 km (37 mi) northeast of Cuneo.

It is the birthplace of 20th century author Cesare Pavese. On its hill are a medieval castle and a Benedictine convent, most likely built on the ruins of a temple of Jupiter. The medieval village of Santo Stefano Belbo stands between the Langhe hills. In the early fourteenth century it was first a fiefdom of the Marquises of Monferrato, then the Marchesi of Saluzzo, and then the family of Scarampi. The town was often in dispute, demonstrated by an ancient medieval tower, destroyed in the war between Spain and Austria in 1600.

The economy of Santo Stefano Belbo relies mainly on the production of wine, especially the Moscato d'Asti and Asti Spumante.
