= Castino =

- Comune
- Comune di Castino
- Coat of arms

- Location within Italy Location within Piedmont
- Coordinates: 44°37′N 8°11′E
- Country: Italy
- Region: Piedmont
- Province: Cuneo (CN)

Government
  - Mayor: Enrico Paroldo

Area
  - Total: 15.5 km^{2} (6.0 sq mi)
- Elevation: 525 m (1,722 ft)

Population (30 November 2017)
  - Total: 497
  - Density: 32.1/km^{2} (83.0/sq mi)
- Demonym: Castinesi
- Time zone: UTC+1 (CET)
  - Summer (DST): UTC+2 (CEST)
- Postal code: 12050
- Dialing code: 0173
- Patron saint: St. Bovo
- Saint day: 22 May

Castino is an Italian village located in Piedmont (Province of Cuneo), about 60 kilometres (37 mi) southeast of Turin and about 60 kilometres (37 mi) northeast of Cuneo.

It is on a ridge between two valleys named after the rivers Bormida and Belbo.
