= Nizza DOCG =

Geographically protected Italian wine

Nizza
- Wine region
- Type: DOCG
- Year established: 2014
- Years of wine industry: Promoted from a Barbera d'Asti Superiore subzone
- Country: Italy
- Part of: Piemonte
- Other regions in Piemonte: Barbera d'Asti
- Size of planted vineyards: 250 hectares (620 acres)
- Varietals produced: Barbera
- Wine produced: 2,420 hl

Nizza (also Barbera d'Asti Superiore Nizza before 2014) is a DOCG red Italian wine produced in the northern Italian region of Piedmont. It is made from the Barbera grape, and the zone of production is limited to the comuni (municipalities) of Agliano Terme, Belveglio, Bruno, Calamandrana, Castel Boglione, Castelnuovo Belbo, Castelnuovo Calcea, Castel Rocchero, Cortiglione, Incisa Scapaccino, Moasca, Mombaruzzo, Mombercelli, Nizza Monferrato, Rocchetta Palafea, San Marzano Oliveto, Vaglio Serra and Vinchio within the province of Asti. In this area Barbera is the leading grape variety grown, because the pedoclimatic conditions here are particularly favourable for its ripening.

The zone of production is centered on the town of Nizza Monferrato, from which the wine derives its name.

== History ==
Nizza was promoted to DOCG status in 2014. Before that date it had been a Superiore subzone of the Barbera d'Asti DOCG.

== DOCG regulations ==
Nizza production rules specify:

- Grape composition: 100% Barbera
- Maximum yield: 7 tonnes/ha
- Minimum alcohol: 13% (13.5% if a single vineyard is named on the label)
- Minimum barrel aging: 6 months (or 12 months for wine labelled 'Riserva')
- Minimum total aging: 18 months (or 30 months for wine labelled 'Riserva')

== Environment ==
Nizza vines are sun-demanding and normally occupy the best-exposed slopes that face from southeast to west; the valleys are excluded. The production area is the focus of the so-called Tertiary Piedmont Basin, a hilly region that originated from the lifting of the seabed during the late Tertiary epoch; the soils are calcareous, of medium depth, and characterized by sandy-clay marls and stratified sandstones.
