= Barbera =

Variety of grape

- Grape (Vitis)
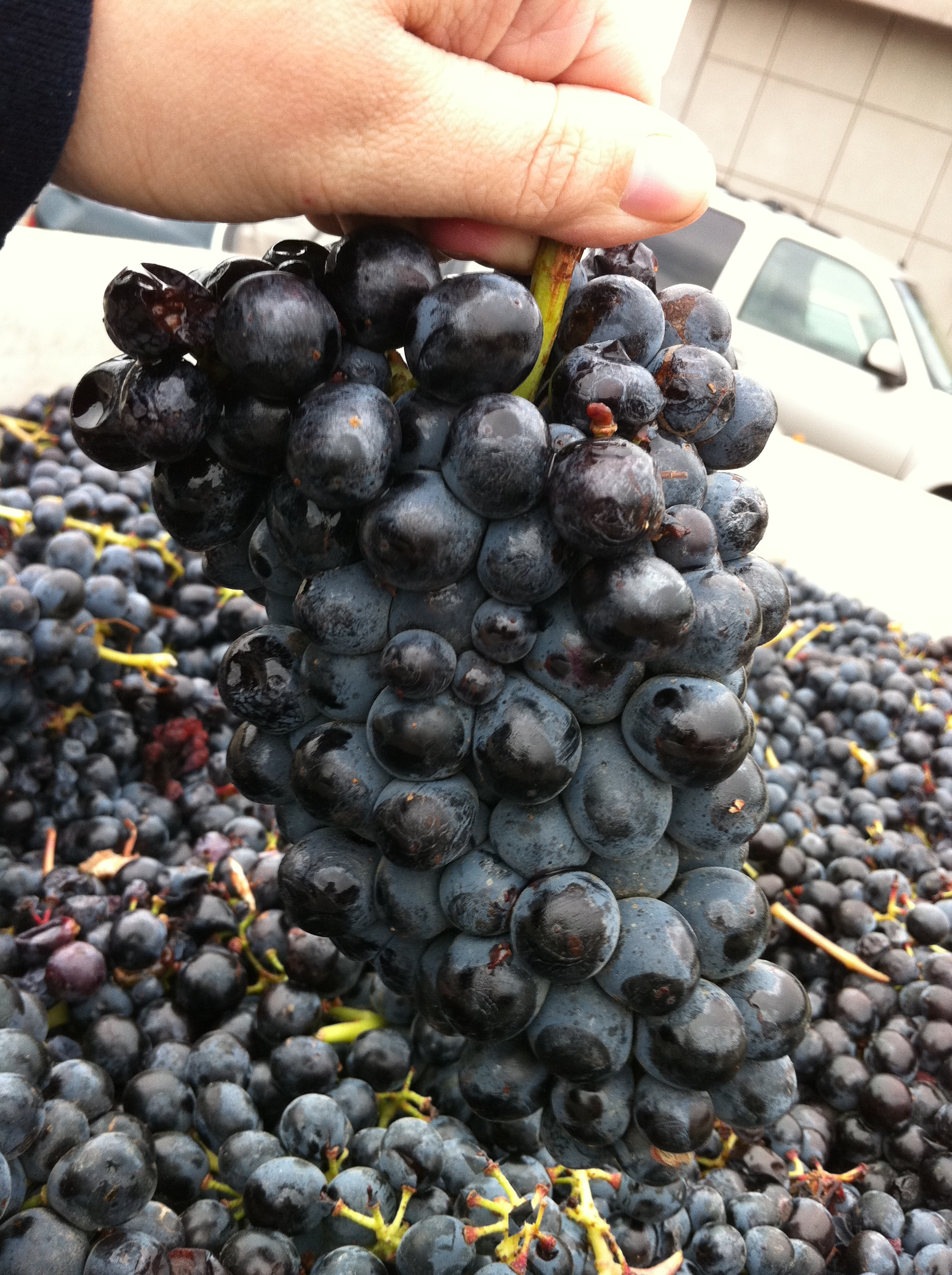
- Cluster of Barbera grapes
- Color of berry skin: Noir
- Species: Vitis vinifera
- Also called: (more)
- Origin: Italy
- Notable regions: Montferrat (Italy), California, Australia and Argentina
- Notable wines: Nizza, Barbera d'Asti
- VIVC number: 974

Barbera is a red Italian wine grape variety that, as of 2000, was the third most-planted red grape variety in Italy (after Sangiovese and Montepulciano). It produces good yields and is known for deep color, full body, low tannins and high levels of acidity.

Century-old vines still exist in many regional vineyards and allow for the production of long-aging, robust red wines with intense fruit and enhanced tannic content. The best-known appellation is the DOCG (Denominazione di Origine Controllata e Garantita) Barbera d'Asti in the Piedmont region: the highest-quality Nizza DOCG wines are produced within a sub-zone of the Barbera d'Asti production area. When young, the wines offer a very intense aroma of fresh red cherries and blackberries. In the lightest versions notes of cherries, raspberries and blueberries and with notes of blackberry and black cherries in wines made of more ripe grapes. Many producers employ the use of toasted oak barrels, which provides for increased complexity, aging potential, and hints of vanilla notes. The lightest versions are generally known for flavors and aromas of fresh fruit and dried fruits, and are not recommended for cellaring. Wines with a better balance between acid and fruit, often with the addition of oak and having a high alcohol content are more capable of cellaring; these wines often result from reduced-yield viticultural methods.

== History ==
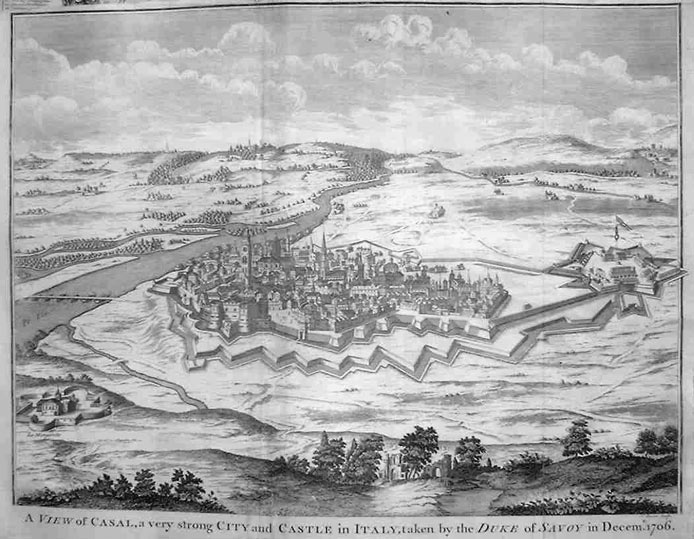
An 18th-century engraving of the city of Casal Monferrato in whose cathedral archive the earliest known planting of Barbera is documented

Barbera is believed to have originated in the hills of Monferrato in central Piemonte, Italy, where it has been known since the thirteenth century. Documents from the cathedral of Casale Monferrato between 1246 and 1277 detail leasing agreements of vineyard lands planted with "de bonis vitibus barbexinis" or Barbera, as it was known then. However, one ampelographer, Pierre Viala, speculates that Barbera originated in the Lombardy region of Oltrepò Pavese. In the 19th and 20th centuries, waves of Italian immigrants brought Barbera to the Americas where the vine took root in California and Argentina among other places. Recent DNA evidence suggest that Barbera may be related to the French-Spanish vine Mourvedre. In 1985, the Piedmont region was rocked by a scandal involving Barbera producers illegally adding methanol to their wines, killing over 30 people and causing many more to lose their sight. The bad press and publicity saw a steady decline in Barbera sales and plantings, allowing the grape to be eclipsed by the Montepulciano grape as Italy's second most widely planted red grape variety in the late 1990s.

== Viticulture ==
The Barbera vine is very vigorous and capable of producing high yields if not kept in check by pruning and other methods. Excessive yields can diminish the fruit quality in the grape and accentuate Barbera's natural acidity and sharpness. In Piedmont, the vine was prized for its yields and ability to ripen two weeks earlier than Nebbiolo even on vineyard sites with less than ideal exposure. This allowed the Piedmontese winemakers in regions like Alba to give their best sites over to the more difficult-to-cultivate Nebbiolo and still produce quality wine with Barbera that could be consumed earlier while the Nebbiolo ages. Harvest for Barbera usually takes place in late September-early October, usually two weeks after Dolcetto has been picked. In recent times, winemakers have been experimenting with harvesting Barbera later at higher sugar levels to produce heavier, more fruit-forward wines. In some vintages, these producers may even harvest their Barbera after Nebbiolo.

Barbera can adapt to a wide range of vineyard soils but tends to thrive most in less fertile calcareous soils and clay loam. Sandy soils can help limit the vigor and yields. The grape rarely thrives in very alkaline or saline soils. Like many grape varieties with a long history, the Barbera vine has seen mutation and clonal variation arise with different clones of the variety found in Piedmont, Lombardy, Emilia-Romagna and the Mezzogiorno. The different clones can be identified by the size and shape of their grape clusters with the smaller cluster clones producing the highest quality wine. In recent years, viticulturists have been working with clonal selection to increase Barbera's resistance to the leafroll virus.

== Winemaking ==
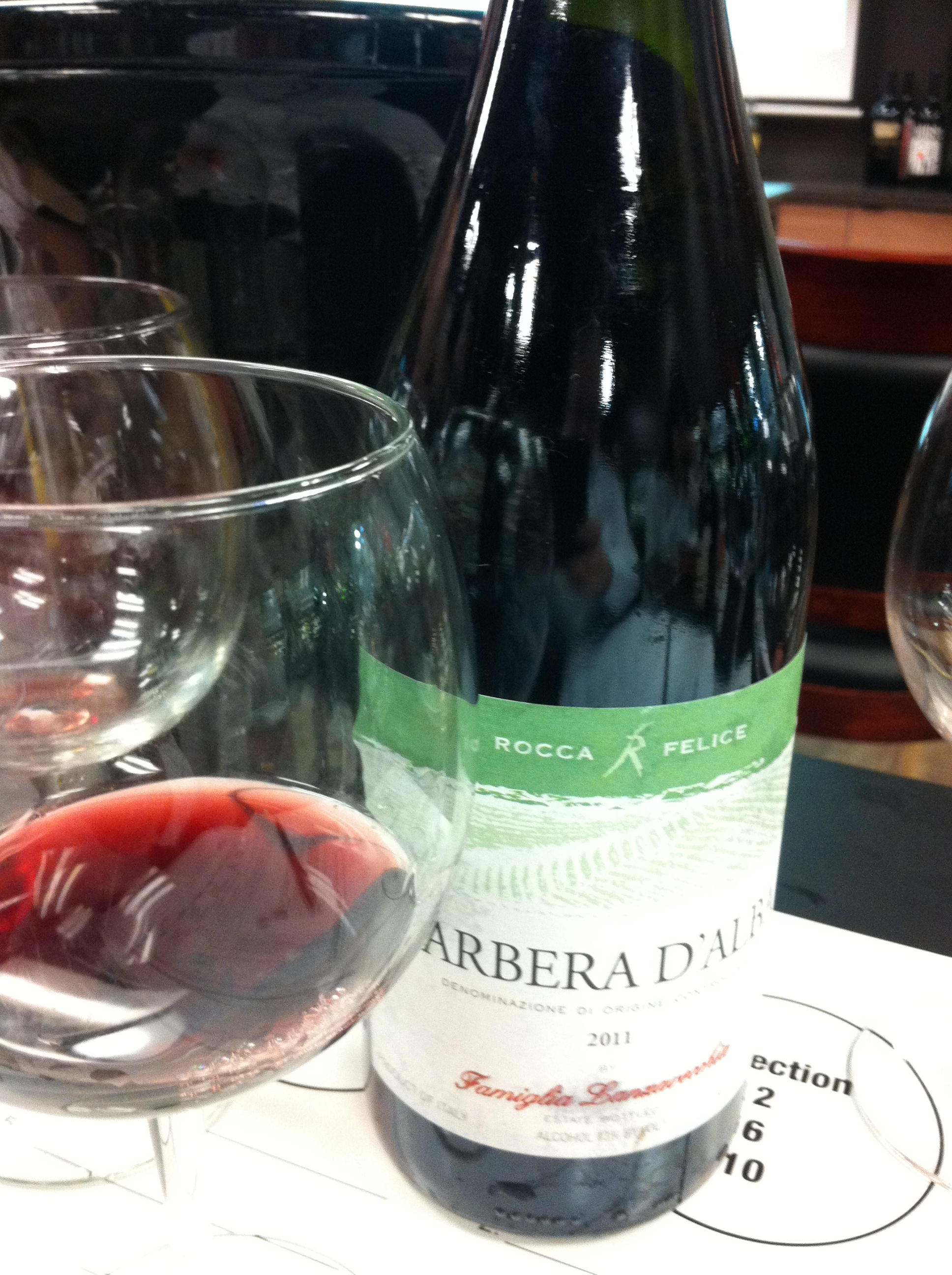
A Barbera d'Alba from Piedmont

Winemakers working with Barbera have a variety of ways to deal with the grape's high acidity and moderate astringency. The most common has been through blending with varieties lacking those components and creating a softer and potentially more balanced wine as a result.

In the 1970s, the French enologist Emile Peynaud recommended that Barbera producers use small oak barrels for fermentation and maturation in order to add subtle oak spice flavors and limited levels of oxygenation to soften the wine. The added oxygen would also limit the reductive quality of Barbera and the occurrence of off-odors of hydrogen sulfide that would occur in some examples. The polysaccharides picked up from the oak, was found to increase the richness of Barbera. At the time, his recommendation met some resistance from the tradition-minded Barbera producers, but the success of the "Super Tuscans" which introduced new oak barrel treatment to Sangiovese caused many producers to reconsider. In addition to the subtle oxygenation and spice notes, oak imparts to the wine ligneous wood tannins which give structure to the wine without adding as much astringent bite as the tannins derived from the phenolic compounds of the grape. This, coupled with reduced maceration time, contributed to the production of softer wines. Lower yields and harvesting riper grapes with more fruit and sugar have been found to be a better balance for Barbera's high acidity.

== Wine regions ==
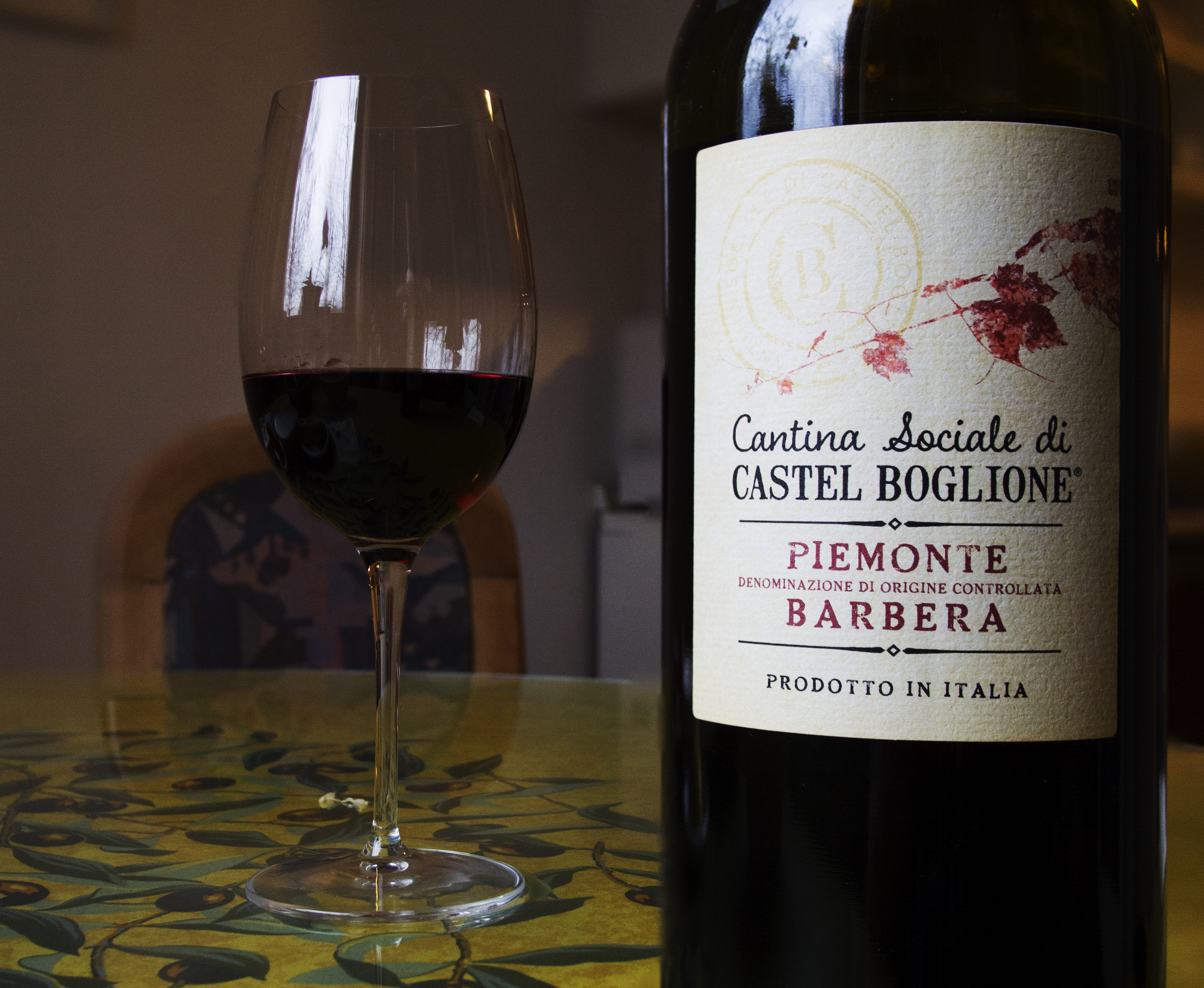
Barbera wine from Piedmont region

Northwest Italy is the viticultural home for Barbera, but Italian immigrants spread it through much of the New World, where its acidity is valued in blended wines for the 'freshness' it imparts. Barbera is found in the northwestern part of Italy, particularly in Monferrato, and to a lesser extent further south. Nearly half of all grapevine plantings in Piedmont are Barbera. It likes the same conditions as Nebbiolo, but the latter is more profitable, fetching nearly twice the price, so is grown on the best sites. The earlier-ripening Barbera is grown on the cooler lower slopes below the Nebbiolo, and other secondary locations. This explains why relatively little Barbera is grown around Alba, where the wines are entitled to the appellation Barbera d'Alba. Thus the best-known Barbera is the DOCG of Barbera d'Asti. The Barbera del Monferrato DOC – which tends to be somewhat sparkling (frizzante) – is rarely exported.

Nizza (also Barbera d'Asti Superiore Nizza before 2014) is a DOCG designation whose zone of production is limited to the comuni (municipalities) of Agliano Terme, Belveglio, Bruno, Calamandrana, Castel Boglione, Castelnuovo Belbo, Castelnuovo Calcea, Castel Rocchero, Cortiglione, Incisa Scapaccino, Moasca, Mombaruzzo, Mombercelli, Nizza Monferrato, Rocchetta Palafea, San Marzano Oliveto, Vaglio Serra and Vinchio within the province of Asti.

=== Italy ===
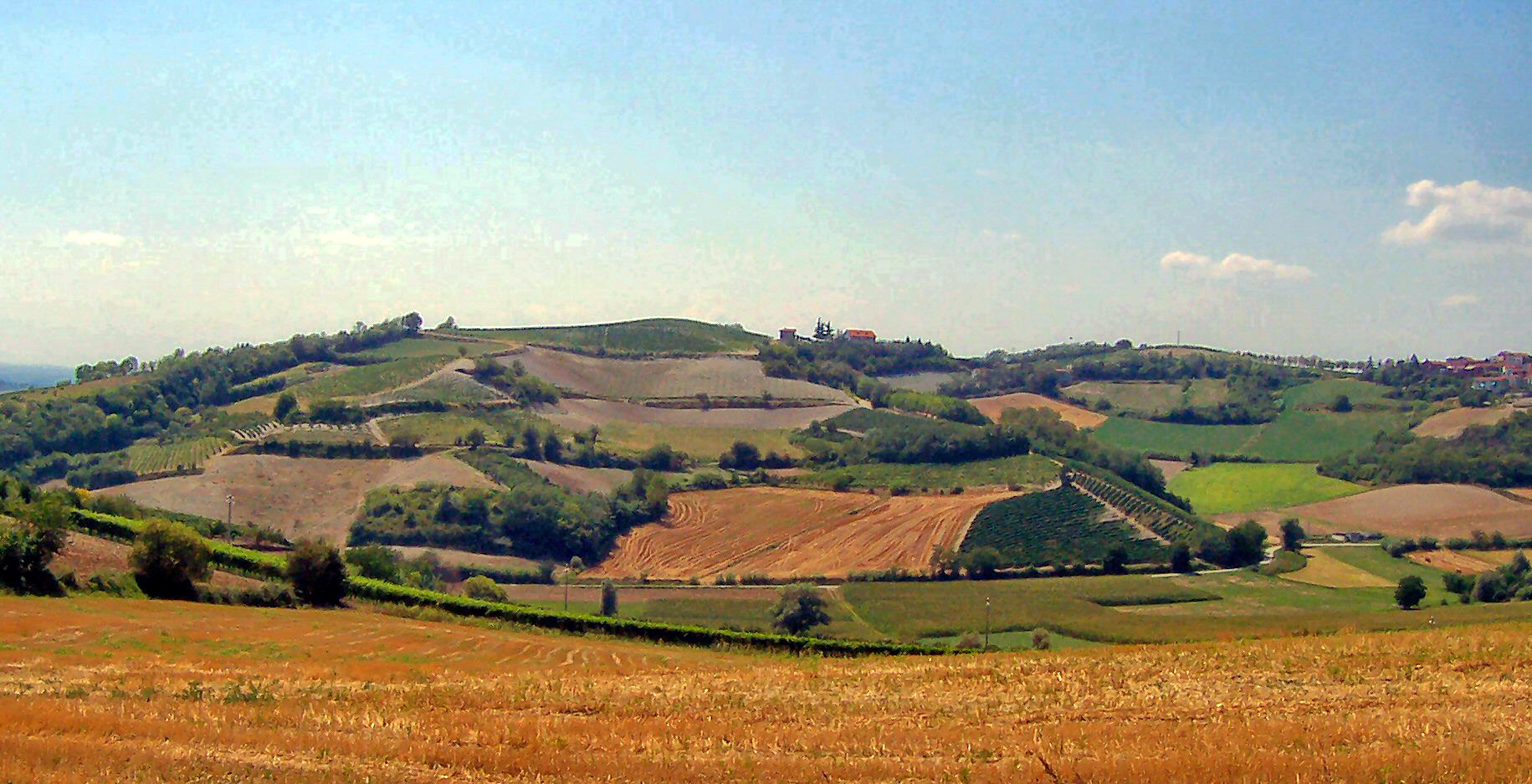
A landscape in Monferrato

As of 2010, there were 20,524 hectares (50,720 acres) of Barbera planted, making it the sixth most widely planted red grape variety in Italy. At its highpoint in the late 20th century, there were over 50,000 hectares (120,000 acres) planted but the fallout from the "Methanol scandal" of the 1980s and the lack of a driving worldwide market caused those numbers to decline. In the Piedmont region, Barbera is widely grown in the Alba Langhe region and the Asti and Monferrato regions. While there is no officially defined Classico region, like Chianti Classico, the region of the Asti province between the towns of Nizza Monferrato, Vinchio, Castelnuovo Calcea, Agliano, Belveglio and Rocchetta is considered among locals to be the "heart" of Barbera in Piedmont. In 2001, the town of Nizza was officially recognized as a sub-region within the greater Barbera d'Asti DOC. Being one of the warmest areas in Asti, Nizza has the potential to produce the ripest Barbera with sugar levels to match some of the grape's high acidity. The wines of Barbera d'Asti tend to be bright in color and elegant while Barbera d'Alba tends to have a deep color with more intense, powerful fruit. In the Alba region many of the best vineyard sites are dedicated to Nebbiolo with Barbera relegated to a secondary location, which limits the quality and quantities of the wines labeled with the Barbera d'Alba DOC. In the Monferrato DOC, Barbera is blended with up to 15% Freisa, Grignolino and Dolcetto and can be slightly sparkling.

Since 2000, it has been possible to produce Barbera d'Asti Superiore, for which the wine must have an alcoholic strength of at least 12.5% by volume, and be aged for at least 14 months, 6 months of which stored in oak or chestnut barrels. Many superior producers refine it in small oak barriques to obtain a rounder taste. The superior has the following sub-zones indicated on the label: Nizza, Tinella, or Colli Astiani (Asti).

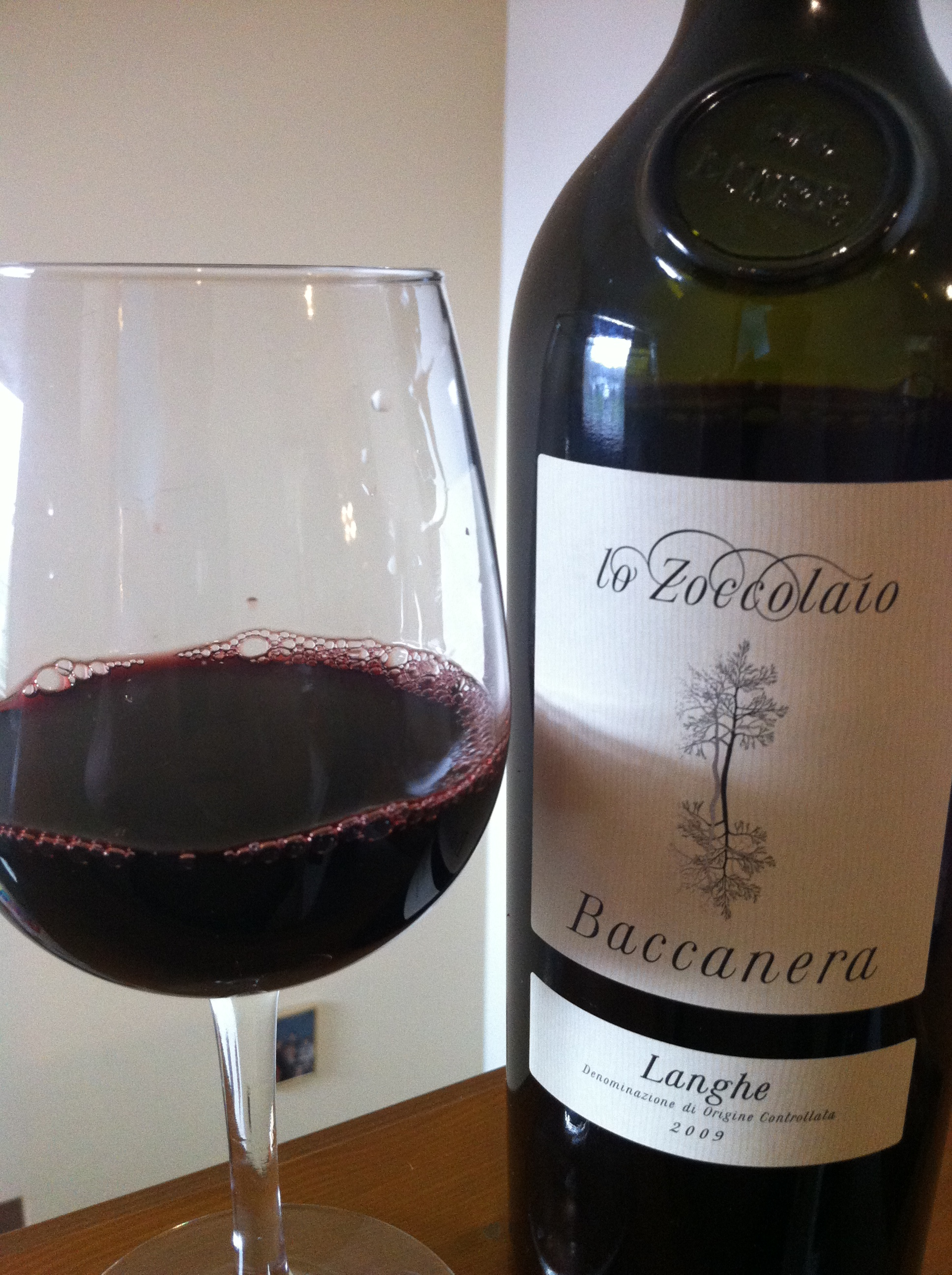
A Cabernet Sauvignon/Barbera blend from the Langhe DOC in Piedmont

Outside Piedmont, Barbera is found throughout Italy, often as a component in mass vino da tavola blends. In the Lombardy region, it is seen as a varietal in Oltrepò Pavese with wines that range from slightly spritzy to semi-sparkling frizzante. Elsewhere in Lombardy, it is blended with Croatina and as part of a larger blend component in the red wines of Franciacorta. Southeast of Piedmont, Barbera is found in Emilia-Romagna in the hills between Piacenza, Bologna, and Parma. As in Lombardy, Barbera is often softened by blending with the lighter Croatina as it is in the Val Tidone region for the DOC wine of Gutturnio. In Sardinia, the grape is used around Cagliari in the wine known as Barbera Sarda, and in Sicily, the grape is used in various blends under the names Perricone or Pignatello made near Agrigento. Barbera was an important grape in re-establishing the wine industry of the Apulia and Campania regions following World War II due to its high yields and easy adaption to mechanical harvesting. Today it is a permitted variety to be blended with Aglianico in the Denominazione di Origine Controllata e Garantita (DOCG) wine of Taurasi though it is rarely used.

=== Outside Italy ===
Although Barbera plantings of over 12,500 hectares (31,000 acres) existed as of 2010 outside Italy, it is rarely found in Europe except for small plantings in Greece, Romania, and the coastal region of Primorska in Slovenia.

The influence of Italian immigrants has led to a scattering of Barbera plantings in South America, notably in Argentina, Brazil, and Uruguay. In Argentina, it is widely grown with 1,061 hectares (2,620 acres) planted as of 2010, mostly in the Mendoza and San Juan provinces, and used mostly for blending.

There are some small plantings in Israel.

Barbera came to Australia with cuttings imported from the University of California, Davis in the 1960s, and as of 2010 accounted for 103 hectares (250 acres) of planting land. It has been grown for about 25 years in the Mudgee region of New South Wales, with later plantings in a number of wine regions, including the King Valley in Victoria as well as the McLaren Vale and the Adelaide Hills regions in South Australia. John Gladstones, in his book Viticulture and Environment, includes Barbera in maturity group 5, which means that it will ripen at about the same time as Shiraz and Merlot, and that it should theoretically find a successful home in many Australian wine regions. Australian wine producers have found some success with Barbera in Victoria. Mount Broke Wines of Broke, is one of the few in New South Wales, Australia.

South African producers have begun widespread plantings of the grape in the warm climate regions of Malmesbury, Wellington and Paarl.

In the United States, there are 4,693 hectares (11,600 acres) of plantings mostly in California, where Barbera is one of the most successful of the Piemontese grapes to be adopted in the state. It is widely planted in the Central Valley, where it is a blend component in mass-produced jug wines. In recent years, the fashion of Italian grapes has caused more California winemakers to look into producing high-quality varietal Barbera. Plantings in the cooler regions of Napa and Sonoma have produced some successful examples. In Washington State, producers have been experimenting with plantings of Barbera in the Red Mountain, Walla Walla, and Columbia Valley AVAs. So far these very young vines have produced fruity wines with strawberry notes and limited complexity and aging potential. In addition to Washington, in the Umpqua AVA of Oregon plantings of Barbara is proving successful, as well as plantings in central and southern Arizona.

== Wines ==
As with many grapes that are widely planted, there is a wide range of quality and variety of Barbera wines from medium bodied, fruity wines to more powerful, intense examples that need cellaring. Some characteristics of the variety are more consistent—namely its deep ruby color, pink rim, pronounced acidity, and normally rather modest levels of tannins. The acidity of Barbera makes it a valued plant in warm climate regions where acidification is usually needed. The color of Barbera makes it a value blending grape and it was historically used in the Barolo & Barberesco region to add color to the natural light Nebbiolo grape.

The use of oak for fermentation or maturation can have a pronounced influence on the flavor and profile of Barbera. Barrel-influenced Barberas tend to be rounder and richer, with more plum and spice notes. Wines made with older or more-neutral oak tend to retain more vibrant aromas and cherry notes. While some producers delay harvest in order to increase sugar levels as a balance to Barbera's acidity, over-ripeness can lead to raisiny flavors.

== Relationship to other grapes ==
Grape breeder Giovanni Dalmasso at the Instituto Sperimentale per la Viticoltura in Conegliano in the Veneto wine region used Barbera as one of the parent vines for many of his crosses. Along with Nebbiolo di Dronero (originally thought to be Nebbiolo but later discovered to be an old French wine grape known as Chatus), Dalmasso crossed Barbera to produce Albarossa, Cornarea, Nebbiera, San Michele and Soperga.

Barbera is also a parent variety behind Ervi (crossed with Croatina), Incrocio Terezi I (with Cabernet franc), Nigra (with Merlot) and Prodest (also with Merlot).

Despite similarities in names, Barbera has no close genetic relationship with the Campanian wine grape Barbera del Sannio or the Sardinian wine grape Barbera Sarda. Also, DNA analysis has shown that the white Piedmont variety Barbera bianca is not a color mutation of Barbera but rather its own distinct variety.

== Synonyms ==
Barbera is known under a variety of local synonyms throughout Italy and worldwide. These include Barber a Raspo, Barbera a Peduncolo, Barbera Amaro, Barbera Crna, Barbera Forte, Barbera Mercantile, Barbera Nera, Barbera Nostrana, Barbera Riccia, Barbera Rissa, Barbera Rosa, Barbera Vera, Barberone, Barbexinis, Besgano, Cosses Barbusen, Gaietto, Lombardesca, Perricone, Pignatello and Ughetta.

== See also ==
- Barbera d'Asti
- List of Italian grape varieties
