= Nizza Monferrato =

Nizza Monferrato Nissa dla Paja (Piedmontese)
- Comune
- Città di Nizza Monferrato
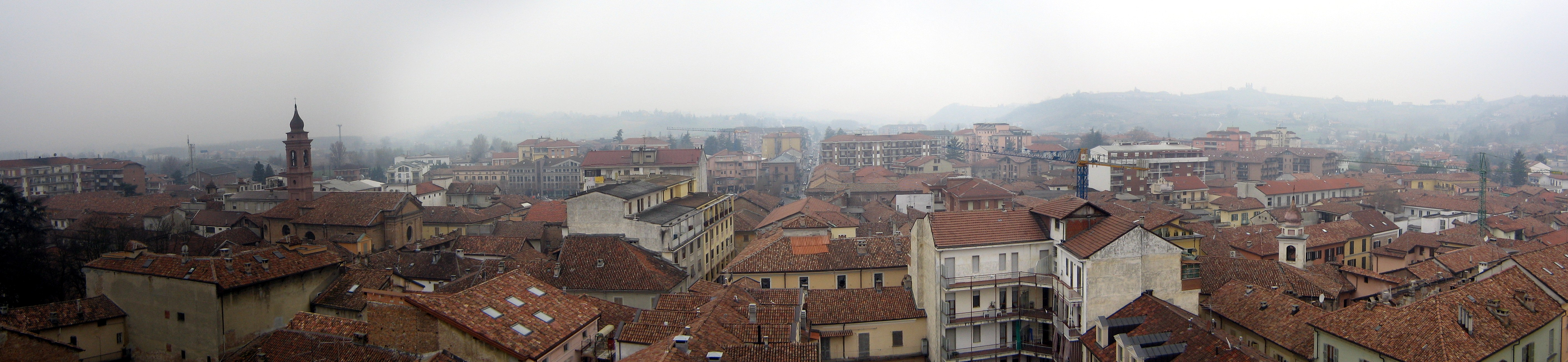
- Panorama of Nizza Monferrato

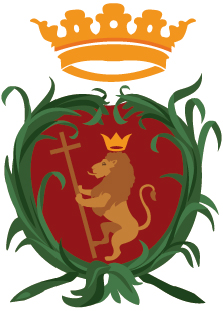
- Coat of arms

- Location within Italy Location within Piedmont
- Coordinates: 44°46′N 8°21′E
- Country: Italy
- Region: Piedmont
- Province: Asti (AT)
- Frazioni: Case Giolito, Istituto San Giuseppe, Ponteverde, Regione Annunziata, Regione Baglio, Regione Bricco, Regione Campolungo, San Michele, San Nicolao, Sant’Anna, Villa Cerreto, Volta

Government
  - Mayor: Simone Nosenzo (Lista Civica-Cambiamo Nizza)

Area
  - Total: 30.4 km^{2} (11.7 sq mi)
- Elevation: 137 m (449 ft)

Population (31 December 2017)
  - Total: 10,313
  - Density: 339/km^{2} (879/sq mi)
- Demonym: Nicesi
- Time zone: UTC+1 (CET)
  - Summer (DST): UTC+2 (CEST)
- Postal code: 14049
- Dialing code: 0141
- Patron saint: Charles Borromeo
- Saint day: 4 November
- Website: Official website

Vineyard Landscape of Piedmont: Langhe-Roero and Monferrato
UNESCO World Heritage Site
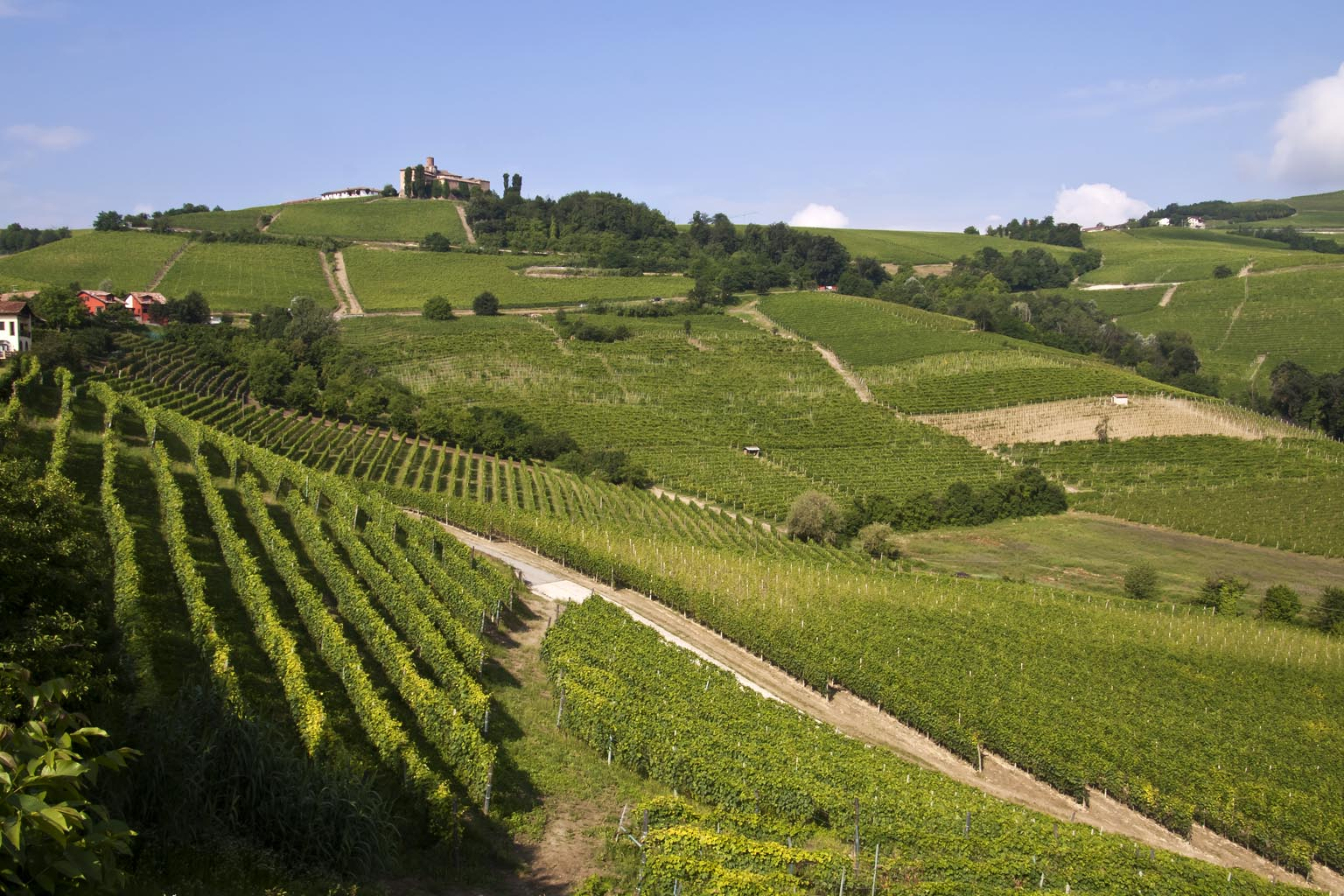
- Barbera vineyards in Nizza Monferrato

- Location within Italy
- Criteria: Cultural: (iii), (v)
- Reference: 1390rev
- Inscription: 2014 (38th Session)
- Website: www.paesaggivitivinicoli.it/en
- Coordinates: 44°36′31″N 7°57′49″E

Nizza Monferrato (Piedmontese: Nissa dla Paja) is a comune (municipality) in the Province of Asti in the Italian region of Piedmont, located about 60 kilometres (37 mi) southeast of Turin and about 20 kilometres (12 mi) southeast of Asti.

Nizza Monferrato borders the following municipalities: Calamandrana, Castel Boglione, Castelnuovo Belbo, Castelnuovo Calcea, Fontanile, Incisa Scapaccino, Mombaruzzo, San Marzano Oliveto, Vaglio Serra, and Vinchio.

== Name ==
Nizza Monferrato is also called Nizza della Paglia – "Nizza with straw", i.e. in the countryside. The suffix Monferrato (or Paglia) is needed to distinguish it from Nizza (the wine) and from Nice in Provence: both Nizza Monferrato and the part of Provence that includes Nice (Nizza Marittima in Italian, Nissa dël Mar in Piedmontese) were at one time part of the Duchy of Savoy.

== Geography ==
Nizza Monferrato is located in the Upper Monferrat, in the south of the Province of Asti, 30 km from the town of Asti. The comune is rich in vineyards, and is traversed by the river Belbo.

== History ==
It is believed that Nizza Monferrato was founded in 1225 by inhabitants of the area after the destruction of some castles in the area of Alessandria. The town was built around the Abbey of San Giovanni in Lanero, close to the river Belbo. It was elevated to the status of comune ten years later, and in 1264 it joined the March of Montferrat (also called the Marquisate of Monferrato).

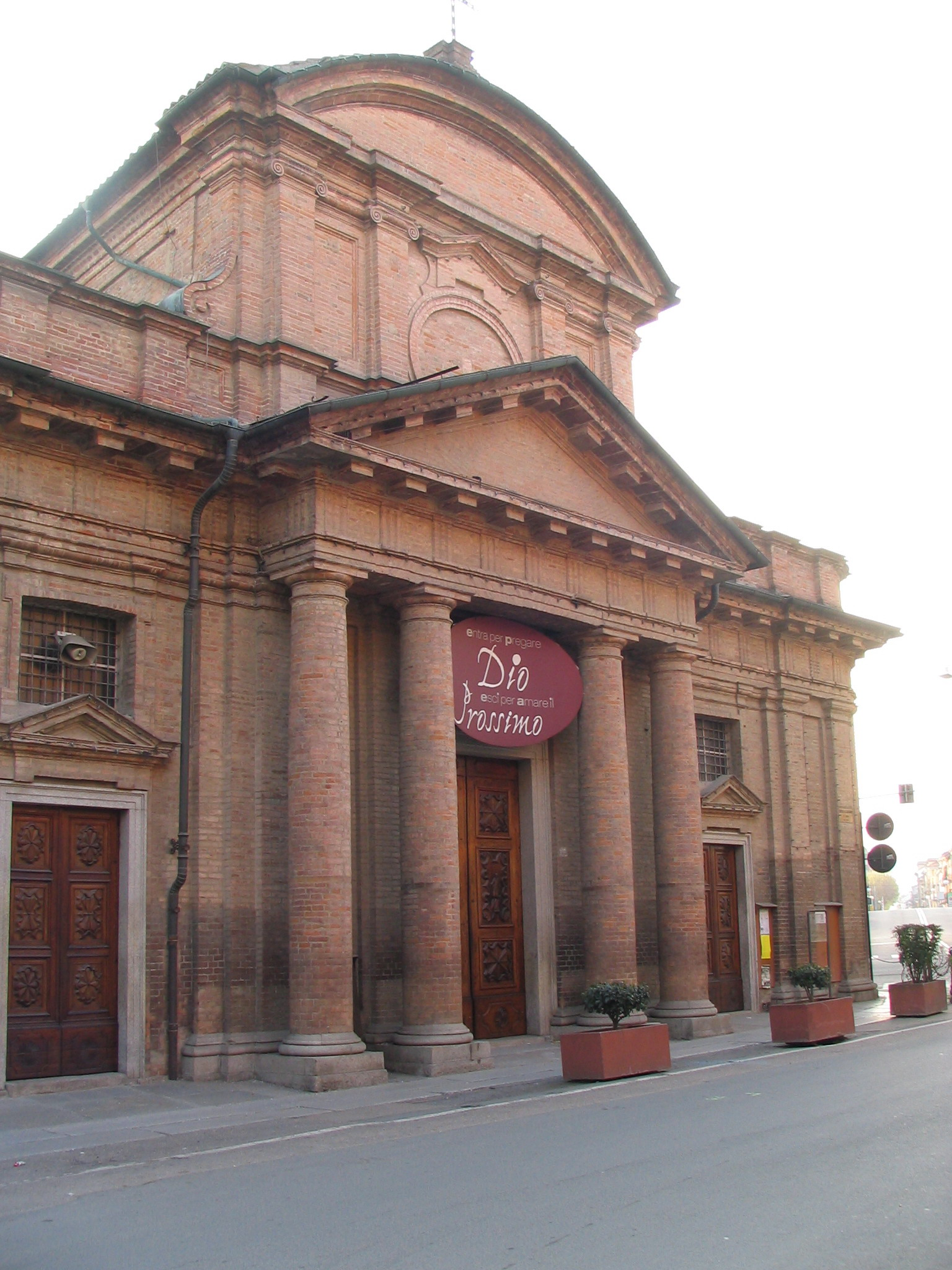
Church of San Giovanni in Lanero

In its history Nizza Monferrato was besieged several times: firstly, in 1268, it resisted a siege by the troops of Charles I of Anjou for forty days. The city changed hands several times: at first it was under the control of the Aleramici, then the Paleologi, and in 1391 the town was devastated by the militias of the Count of Armagnac. The city then passed under the control of the Gonzaga, who were eager to steal its resources. After a period of relative prosperity, the town repulsed an attack of Charles Emmanuel I of Savoy in 1613. It was then repeatedly attacked by the French and Spanish in 1625, 1628 and in 1629.

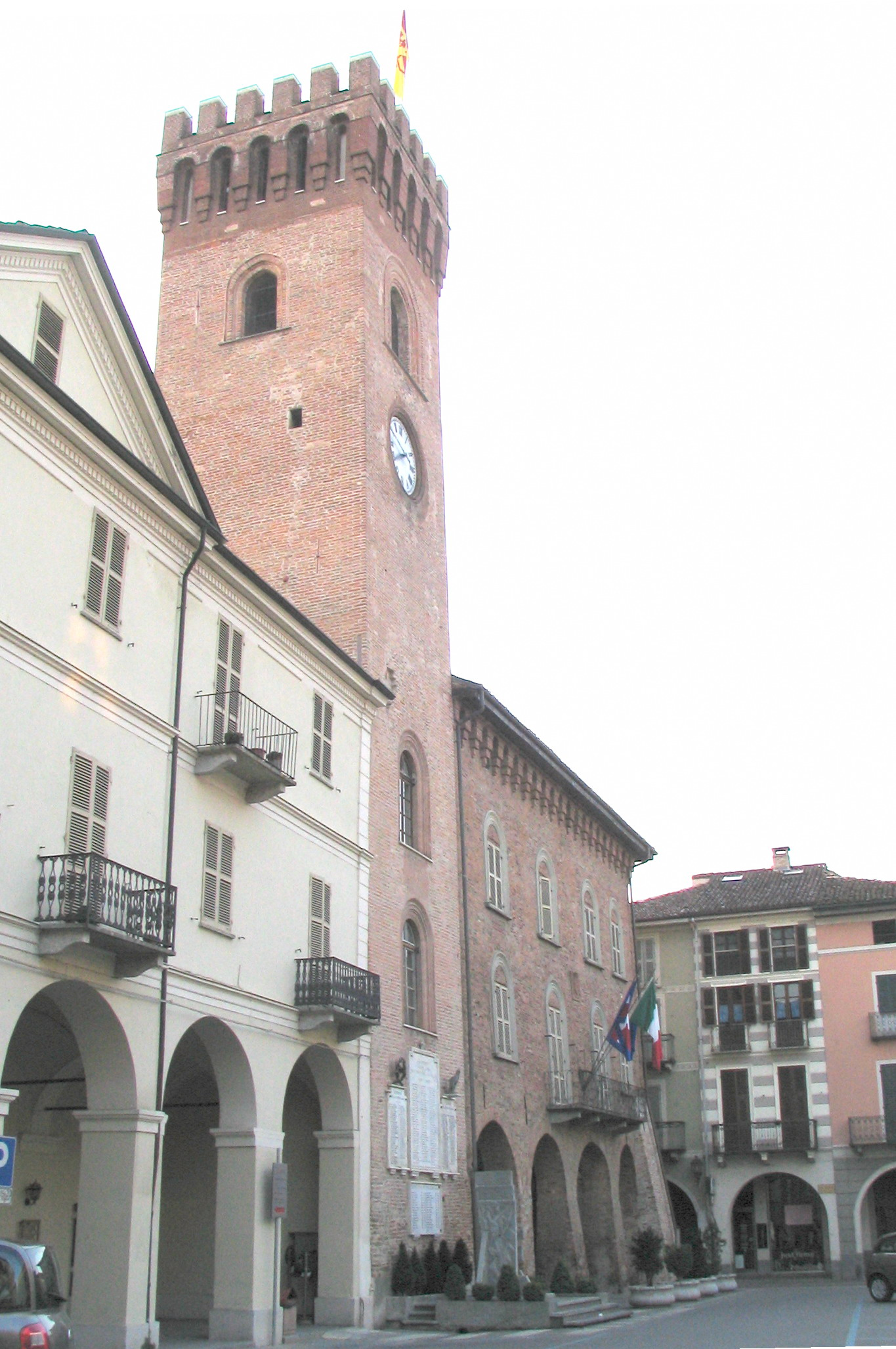
Civic Palazzo (Palazzo Comunale) and clock tower

In 1630 it was brought to its knees by famine and plague, and was again attacked by the French and Spanish in 1637. Ten years later, the town was razed to the ground and its walls torn down by an army from Aragon. The second half of the 17th century was an equally disastrous period: Charles IV of Mantua, anxious to pay the debts incurred by his maladministration of his duchy, completely emptied Nizza Monferrato of everything of value, stripping away all the resources of the area.

The end of this turbulent period came when the town passed to the House of Savoy in 1703. The economy, which had fallen apart in the times of war, began to flourish in the late 18th century: in particular, the town became noted for the production of silk. The revolutionary winds that blew in 1799 passed the town by: residents responded to the bands of insurgents that arrived from neighboring towns with the counter-revolutionary cry of "Long live the king, long live Savoy".

After the Congress of Vienna the Savoy monarchy was restored, and the town resumed its development. Under the careful administration a new mayor, Pio Corsi from Bonsasco, the town was illuminated with oil lamps, an urban road network was created, a sewage system was installed, and the first trade incentives were initiated.

The painter Franco Sassi (1912 to 1993) was an admirer of the town, its countryside and its landscape. This artist – painter, draftsman, engraver and graphic designer – was a friend of Arturo Bersano , creating the labels for his wines. His Monferrato Home (or The Farmhouse at Vinchio) depicts landscapes of Nizza Monferrato. He created labels for Piedmont wine houses such as Gancia, Enrico Serafino, Giuseppe Parodi Spumanti of Canelli, Guasti Clemente Wines of Nizza Monferrato, Giorgio Barbero and Sons of Canelli, and others.

Nizza Monferrato was the capital of the Partisan Republic of Alto Monferrato in 1944, and was awarded the Silver Medal for the Military Valor for the sacrifices of its people and their participation in the partisan struggle against fascism during World War II.

In the autumn of 1968 the town was severely flooded when the Belbo and Nizza rivers burst their banks: the town narrowly avoided a repeat of this disaster in November 1994.

In 2014 Nizza became part of the UNESCO World Heritage Site "Vineyard Landscape of Piedmont: Langhe-Roero and Monferrato" as one of the five wine-growing areas of outstanding landscapes included by the site, called "Nizza Monferrato and Barbera".

== Main sights ==
=== The Town Hall and bell tower ===
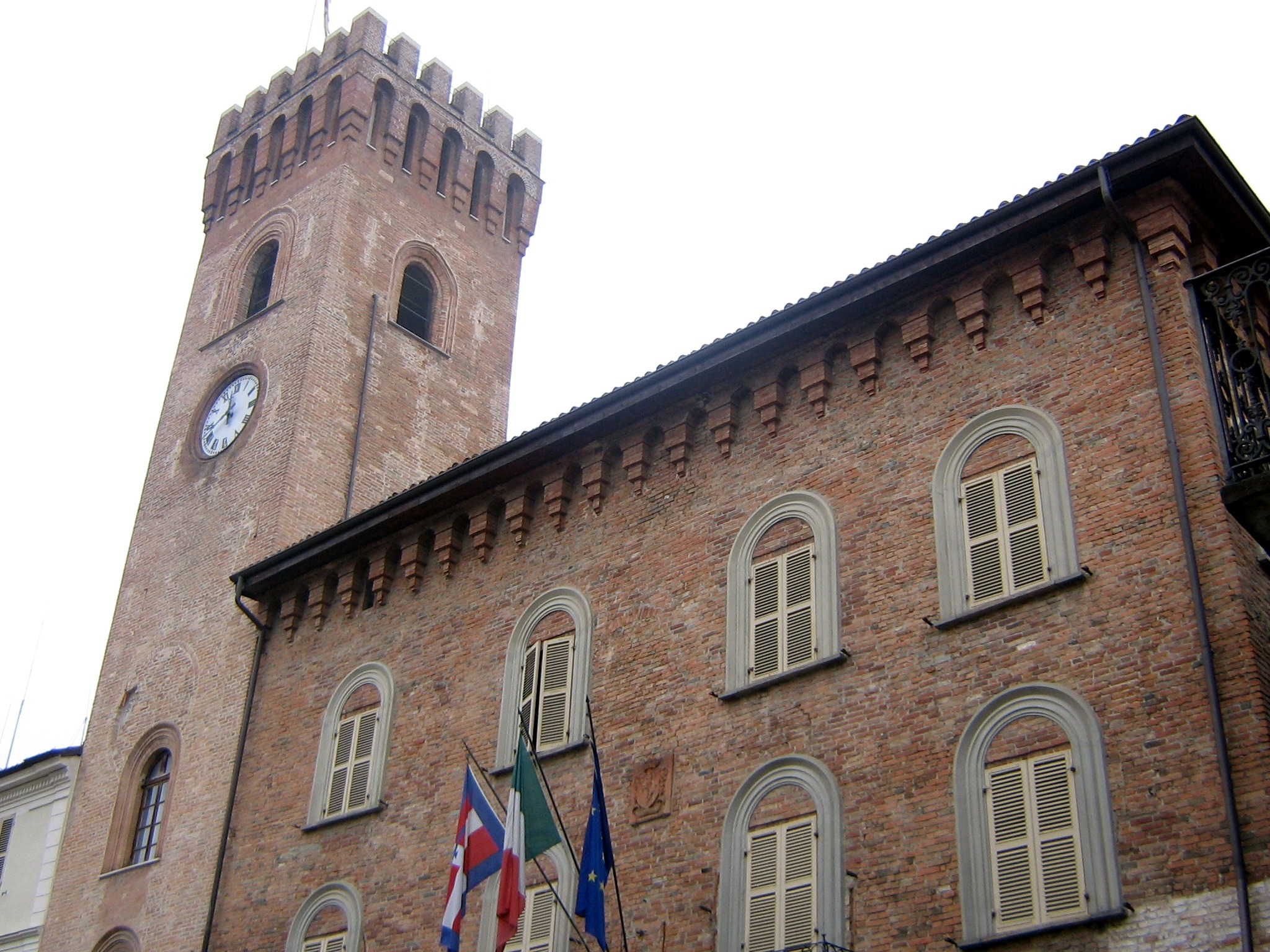
The town hall with its bell tower

The Palazzo Comunale (Town Hall) is an imposing building with a natural brick facade dating from around the 14th or 15th century: it has served since its beginning as the seat of Nizza Monferrato's local government. The building has two upper floors, each of which has four windows, with cornice ornamentation in the form of an arched lunette. On the ground floor it has a broad internal arcade fronted by four arches, each supported by a large pillar. The coat of arms of the town is displayed above the wrought-iron balcony that links the two central windows on the first floor. The most important feature is, however, the ancient bell tower of the Town Hall, known by the citizens of Nizza Monferrato as el campanone.

=== Palazzo Crova ===
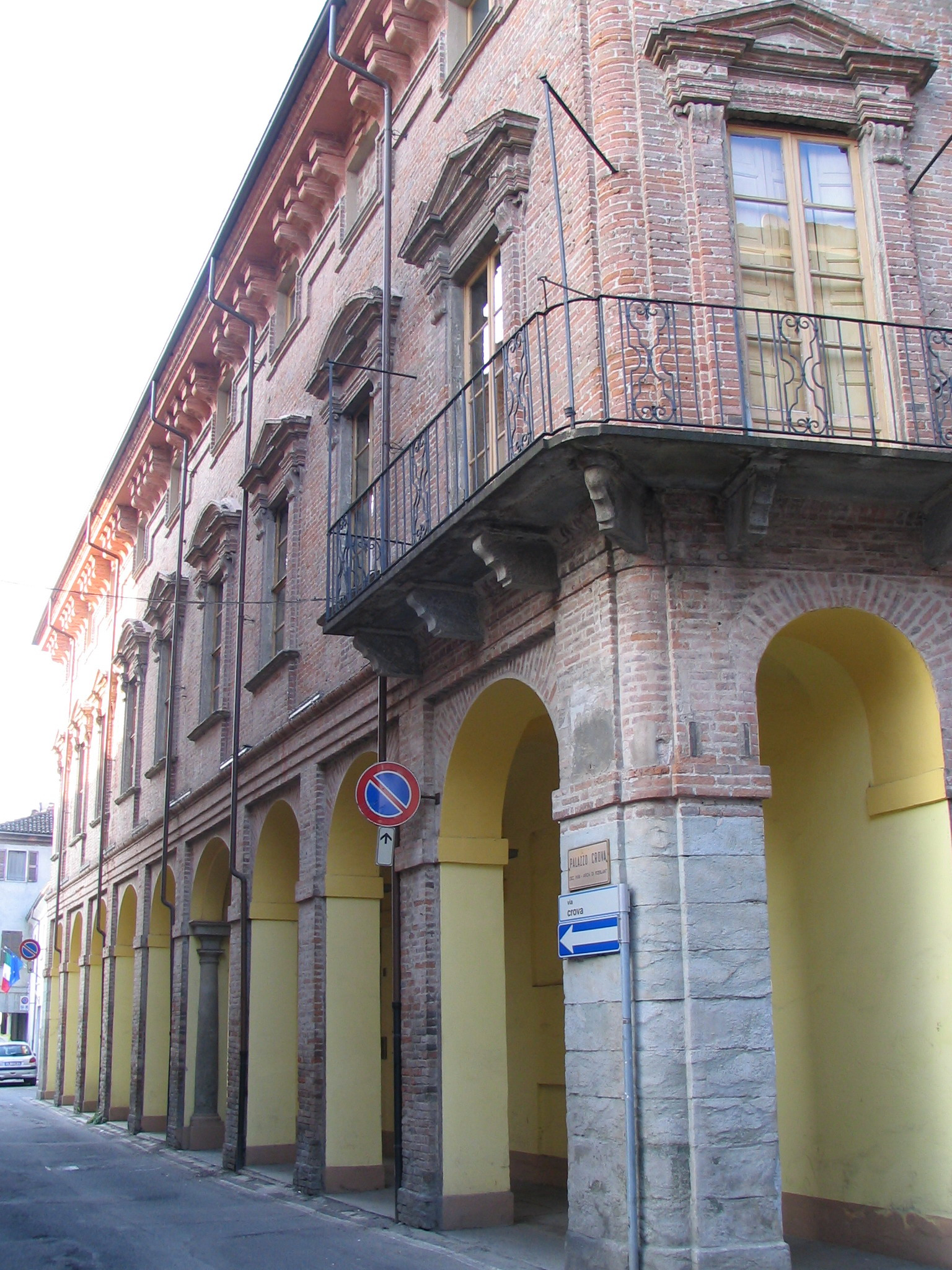
Palazzo Crova (18th century)

Palazzo Crova is located in the Via Pio Corsi. Surrounded by narrow streets, it is a classic 18th century example of a town residence of the nobility. Designed by the architect Robilant, it has a garden enclosed by high walls.

The palace remained in the possession of the descendants of the barons Crova di Vaglio, the original owners of the building, until the early decades of the 20th century. It now houses the town library, a restaurant with a regional enoteca, and the offices of the Colline Nicesi (Nizza Hills) branch of the Slow Food movement and the Barbera d'Asti producers association, as well the Cardo Gobbo di Nizza headquarters.

=== Cattle Market ===
The Cattle Market (Foro Boario) is located on the south side spacious Piazza Garibaldi, the square that is the focal point of Nizza Monferrato. Built around 1800, it a brick building with arches along its entire length, covered by a roof that rests on wooden trusses, now reinforced by metal inserts. The Foro is a symbol of trade and of the cultural events that take place there. In 2008 it was completely restructured: it is now furnished with offices, toilets, new flooring, heating, lighting and large windows that enclose the entire structure, making it ideal for events, conferences and exhibitions. It is also the new location of the Tourist Information Office.

=== Via Maestra ===
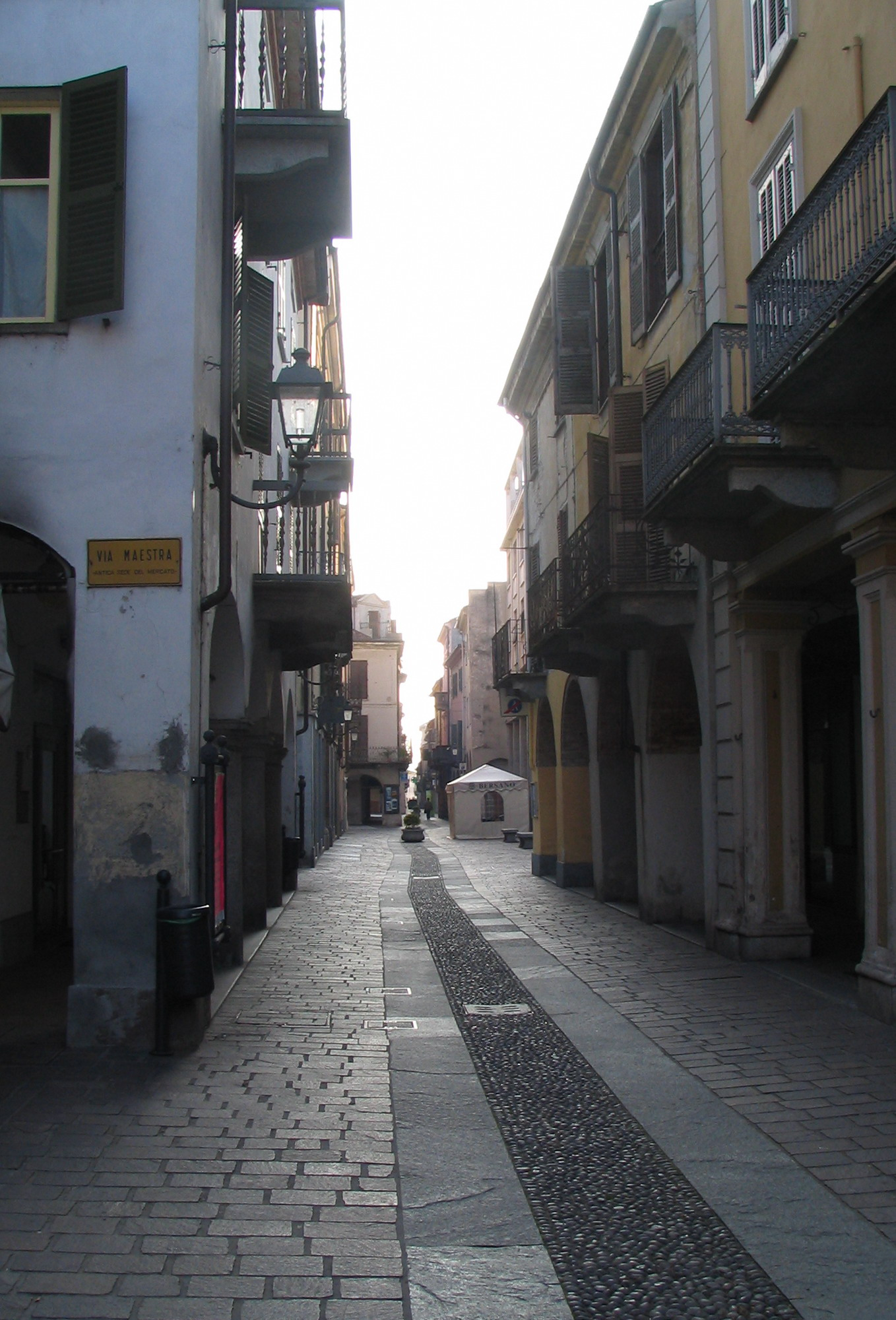
Via Maestra

Via Carlo Alberto, better known as the Via Maestra, connects Piazza Garibaldi with Piazza XX Settembre. Nizza Monferrato's most important thoroughfare, it is lined with the low rounded arches of ancient arcades, below which one can often find the original metal reinforcing rods. Many of the first-floor homes have fine wrought iron balconies, while at ground level there are many shops, full of Nizza character, that date from the 18th and 19th centuries.

=== Churches ===
- Church of San Siro
- Church of San Giovanni in Lanero
- Church of Sant'Ippolito

=== Museums ===
- Rural Museum (Museo delle Contadinerie) – which also includes an exhibition of artwork used by the local wine maker Bersano.

== Food and wine ==
Nizza Monferrato is famous for:

- Nizza, a red DOCG wine made with Barbera grapes, whose production is restricted to 18 local municipalities centered on the town.
- Cardo Gobbo (the hunchback cardoon), a winter vegetable, low in calories, ideal with bagna cauda, that takes its name from the stooping gait of the local gravediggers. Nizza Monferrato is recognised as the origin of Cardo Gobbo by the Slow Food movement.
- La belecàuda, in Nizza dialect, denotes chickpea flour cooked in a wood oven. It is a specialty of Genoese origin that then spread along trade routes to the Ligurian hinterland.

Nizza Monferrato is represented at the Festival delle sagre astigiane (Asti's Festival of Festivals) by belecàuda and by pasta di meliga – maize paste, the basis of polenta.

== Industry ==
Nizza Monerrato is home to several clothing and metalworking companies.

== Famous people ==
- Felice Borel, footballer
- Francesco Cirio, founder of the Cirio food company
- Maria Domenica Mazzarello, saint
- Enzo Bianchi, founder of the Monastic Community of Bose

== Events ==
- Antiques Market; 3rd Sunday of every month
- Fiera del Santo Cristo (Santo Cristo Fair); 2nd Sunday in April
- Barbera in festa (Barbera Wine Festival); in May
- Corsa delle botti (Barrel Race); 1st Sunday in June
- Monferrato in Tavola (Monferrato Table); 1st weekend in June
- Wine Cellars are open to the public on the Sunday after the harvest; in September
- Fiera di San Carlo (San Carlo Fair); 1st week of November (since 1516)

Nizza Monferrato is one of the comuni in the province of Asti that take part in the Palio di Asti on the third Sunday of September, in Asti. Nizza Monferrato won the race in 1986 with the jockey Leonardo Viti on the horse Elf.

== Sport ==
A. C. Nizza, football team wearing a yellow – red stripe, and playing at home in the Tonino Bersano stadium

== Twin towns ==
Nizza Monferrato is twinned with:

- Savignano sul Rubicone, Italy

== See also ==
- Vineyard Landscape of Piedmont: Langhe-Roero and Monferrato
