= Festival of Festivals =

Festival of Festivals may refer to:

- Asti's Festival of Festivals, an annual celebration of country life held in Asti, Italy
- Festival of Festivals, Saint Petersburg, a film festival held in St Petersburg, Russia
- Toronto International Film Festival, formerly Toronto Festival of Festivals, a film festival held in Toronto, Canada
