= Albarossa =

Variety of grape

Albarossa is a red Italian wine grape variety that was created in the Veneto wine region in 1938 by grape breeder Giovanni Dalmasso at the Istituto Sperimentale per la Viticoltura in Conegliano. Dalmasso originally thought he created the grape from a crossing of Nebbiolo and Barbera but DNA profiling in 2009 confirmed that the "Nebbiolo" vine used wasn't Nebbiolo at all but rather a very old French wine grape variety from the Ardèche, Chatus. The confusion stemmed from a synonym of Chatus, Nebbiolo di Dronero (Nebbiolo of Dronero, a small commune in the Piedmont wine region where Nebbiolo is grown but so apparently was Chatus).

== Wine regions ==
Albarossa first became a permitted variety for use in Italian winemaking in 1977 but its commercial use has not taken off. A 2000 census revealed that there is less 10 hectares (25 acres) of the variety planted throughout Italy. In the early 21st century, Piedmont wine producer Michele Chiarlo added a hectare of the grape to his vineyard and began producing a varietal Albarossa under the Monferrato DOC in 2006. The leading producer of Albarossa is Banfi Piemonte with its "La Lus,". Banfi has been encouraging small growers to plant the varietal and promotes the wine through its extensive distribution channels and its annual "Cru Artisan College" educational initiative in the US. Independent wine maker, Marco Bonfante, 8th generation wine producer in Nizza, Piemonte, produces an Albarossa in the appassimento style. The wine is called Albarone, in reference to the Amarone style.

== Viticulture ==
Dalmasso created his original crossing with the aim of combining the quality wine potential of Nebbiolo with Barbera's high yield potential and natural resistance to many viticultural hazards like mold and mildew. While the second parent of Albarossa was later discovered to be Chatus instead of Nebbiolo, the grape did retain many of the viticultural characteristics of Barbera including its ability to ripen late but still maintain good levels of acidity, especially when planted on poor chalky soils.

The Albarossa vine tends to produce compact clusters of very small grape berries with thick skins that have a high phenolic content, particularly of anthocyanins that contribute to wine color. The grape has the potential to hang long the vine, accumulating high sugar and potential alcohol level while still maintaining sufficient acidity.

== Relationship to other grapes ==
Throughout the 1930s, Giovanni Dalmasso made several successful crossings with Nebbiolo di Dronero (Chatus) and Barbera with each of these grapes being a sibling variety to Albarossa. These include Cornarea, Nebbiera, San Michele and Soperga.

== Synonyms ==
Over the years Albarossa Nero has been known under a variety of synonyms including XV/31, Dalmasso 15-31, Incrocio Dalmasso XV-31.
