= Asti's Festival of Festivals =

Italian country festival held in Asti

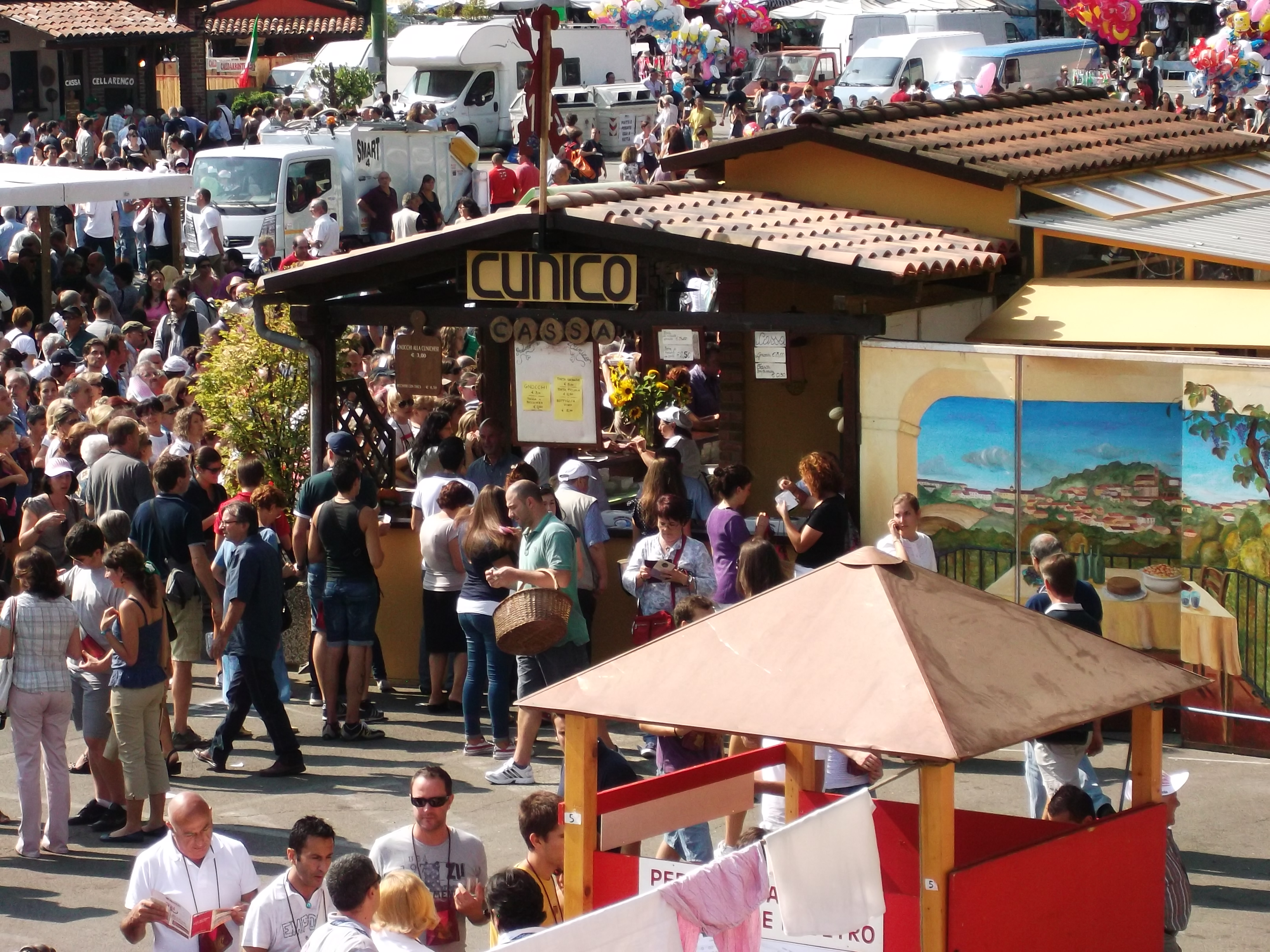
A Pro Loco offering typical Montferrat dishes

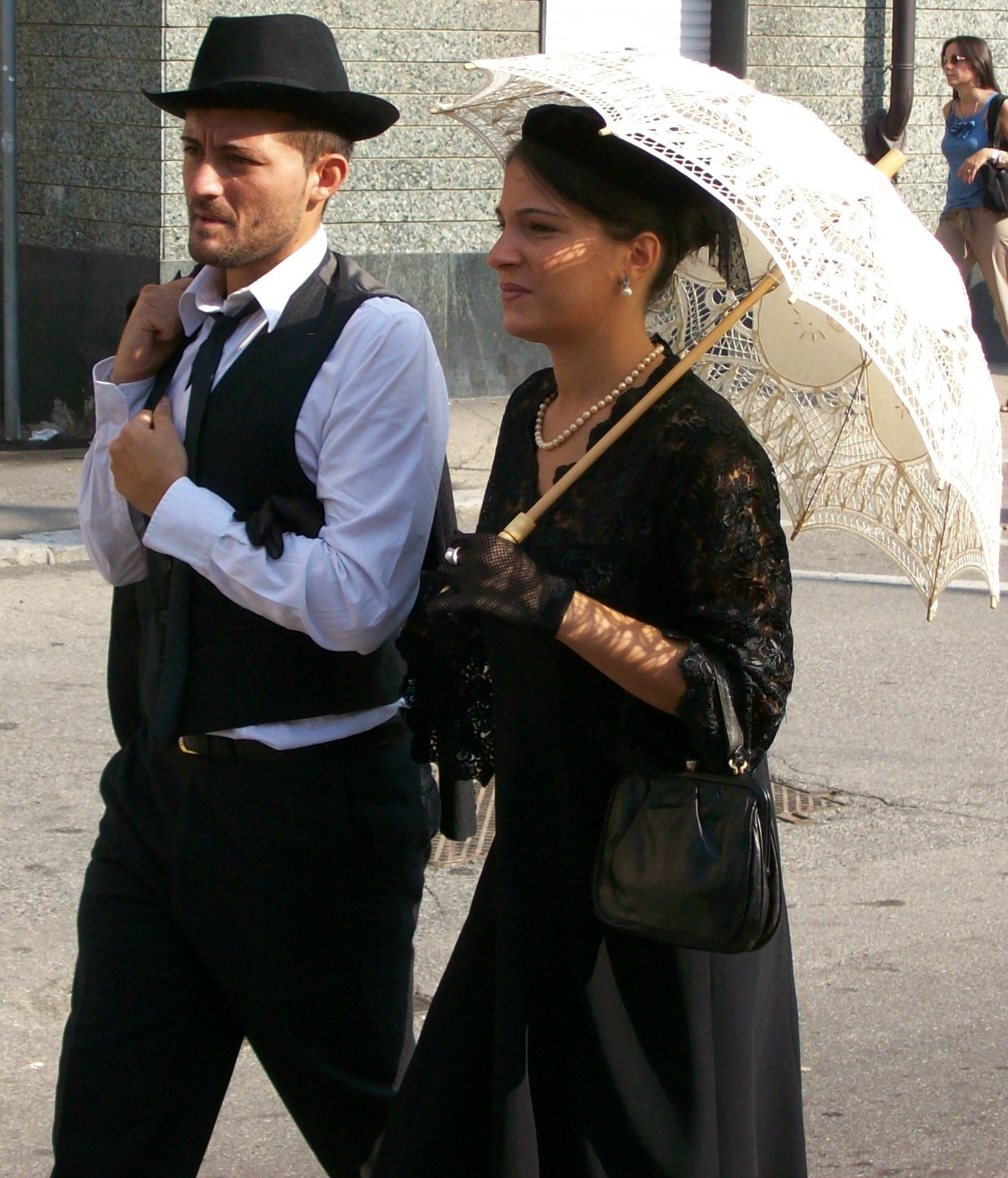
Characters in the parade

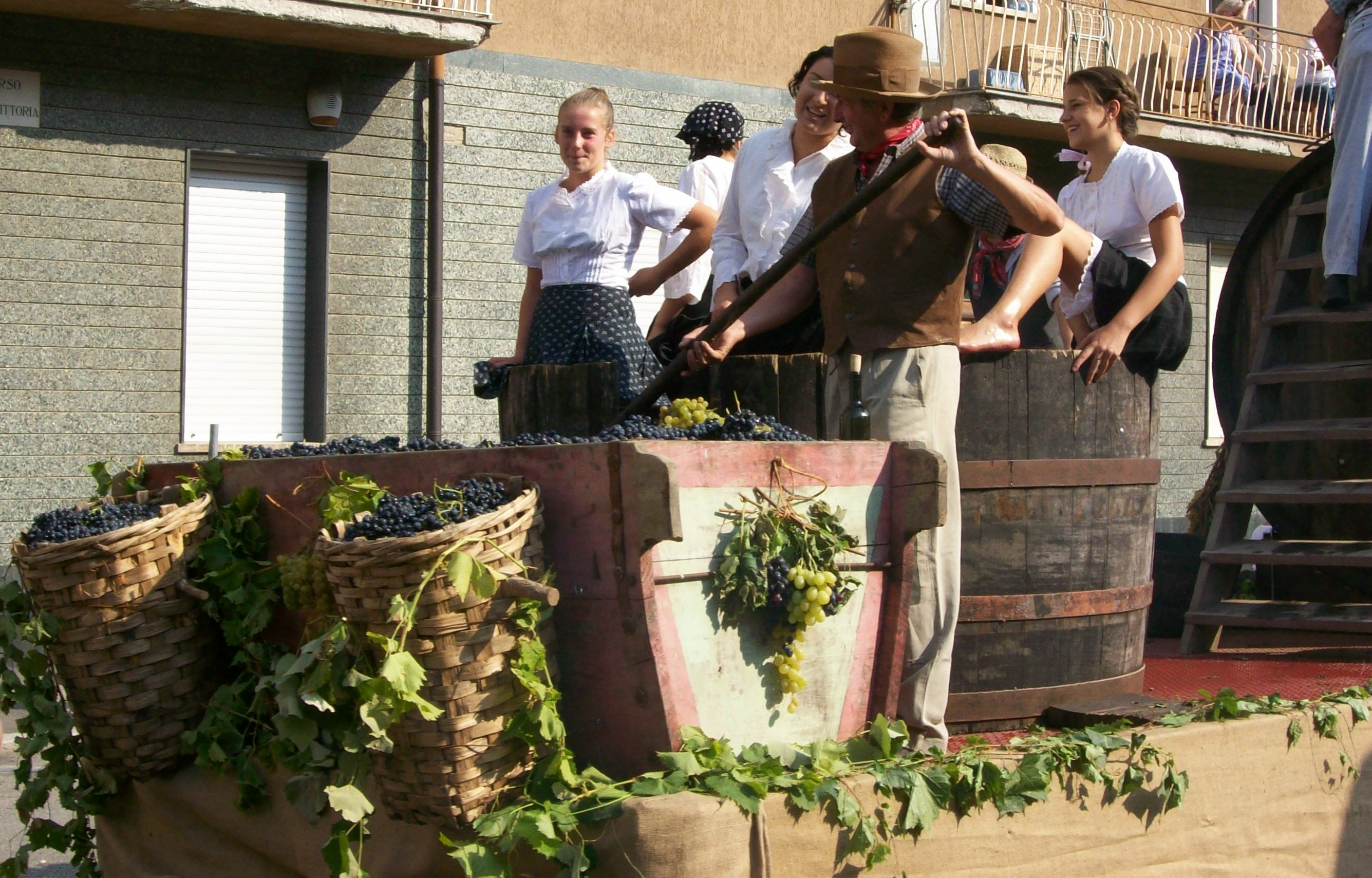
Treading the grapes

The Festival of Festivals (Italian: Festival delle Sagre) or Sagre is an annual festival in Asti, Italy that celebrates the customs and traditions of rural food and culture. It occurs on the second weekend in September during the Settembre Astigiano. Sagre is one of three main September events, the others being the Douja d'Or national wine show and the Palio of Asti.

In 2005, the festival served 200,000 meals.

== History ==
The Sagre festival was started by the Asti Chamber of Commerce president Giovanni Borello in 1974. Borello planned to augment an existing wine festival – Douja d'Or – with a food-centric festival.

The COVID-19 pandemic led to the cancellation of the festival in 2020–21.

== Food and wine fair ==
The Festival delle Sagre features Italy's largest open-air restaurant, offering a variety of authentic Piedmont cuisine. More than 40 Pro Loco organizations of the Province of Asti present their specialties, accompanied by Asti DOC and DOCG wines, from stalls set up in Asti's large, central 'Campo del Palio' square, arranged to re-create an old village atmosphere.

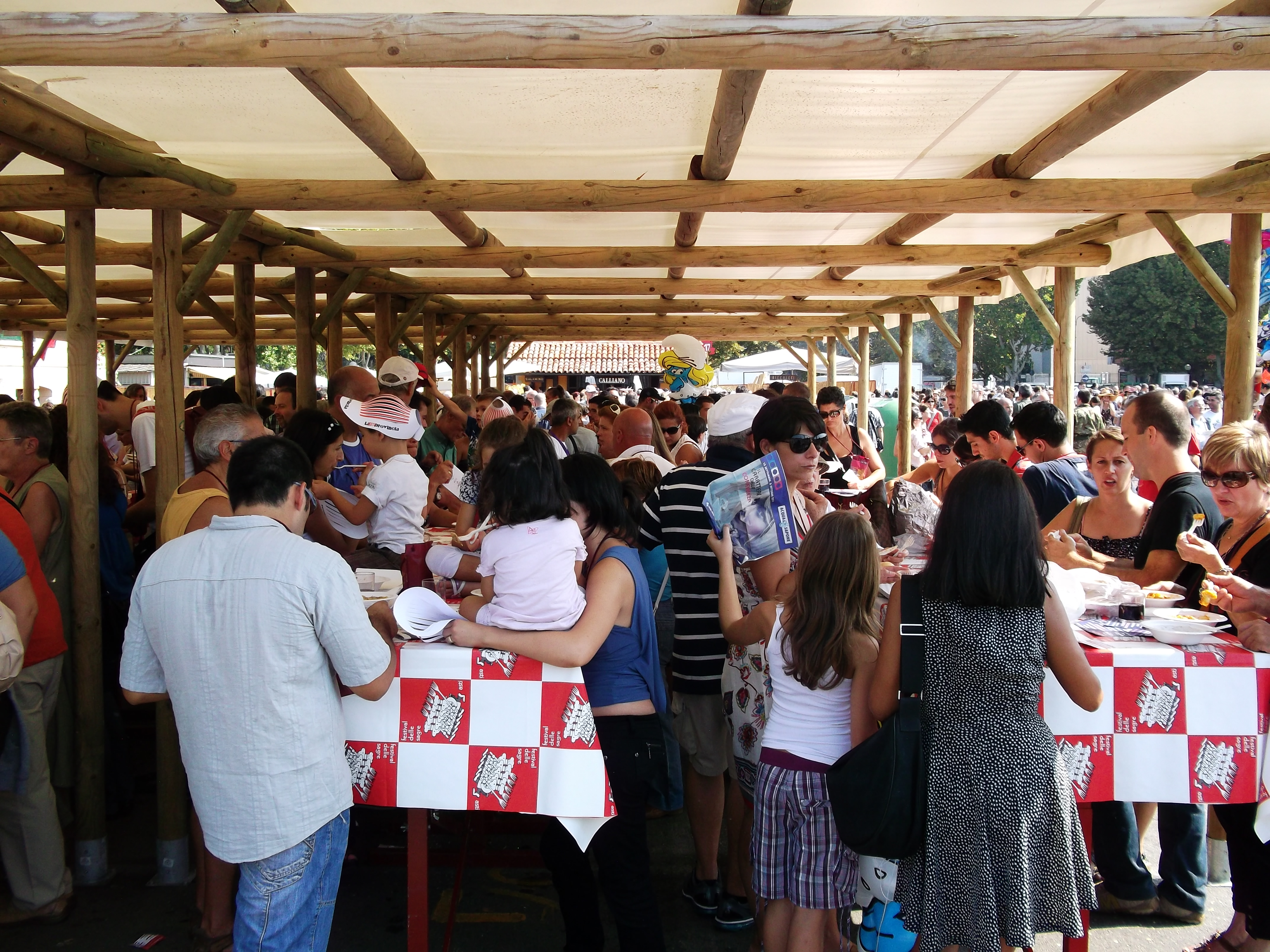
Festival of Festivals: inside one of the many stalls

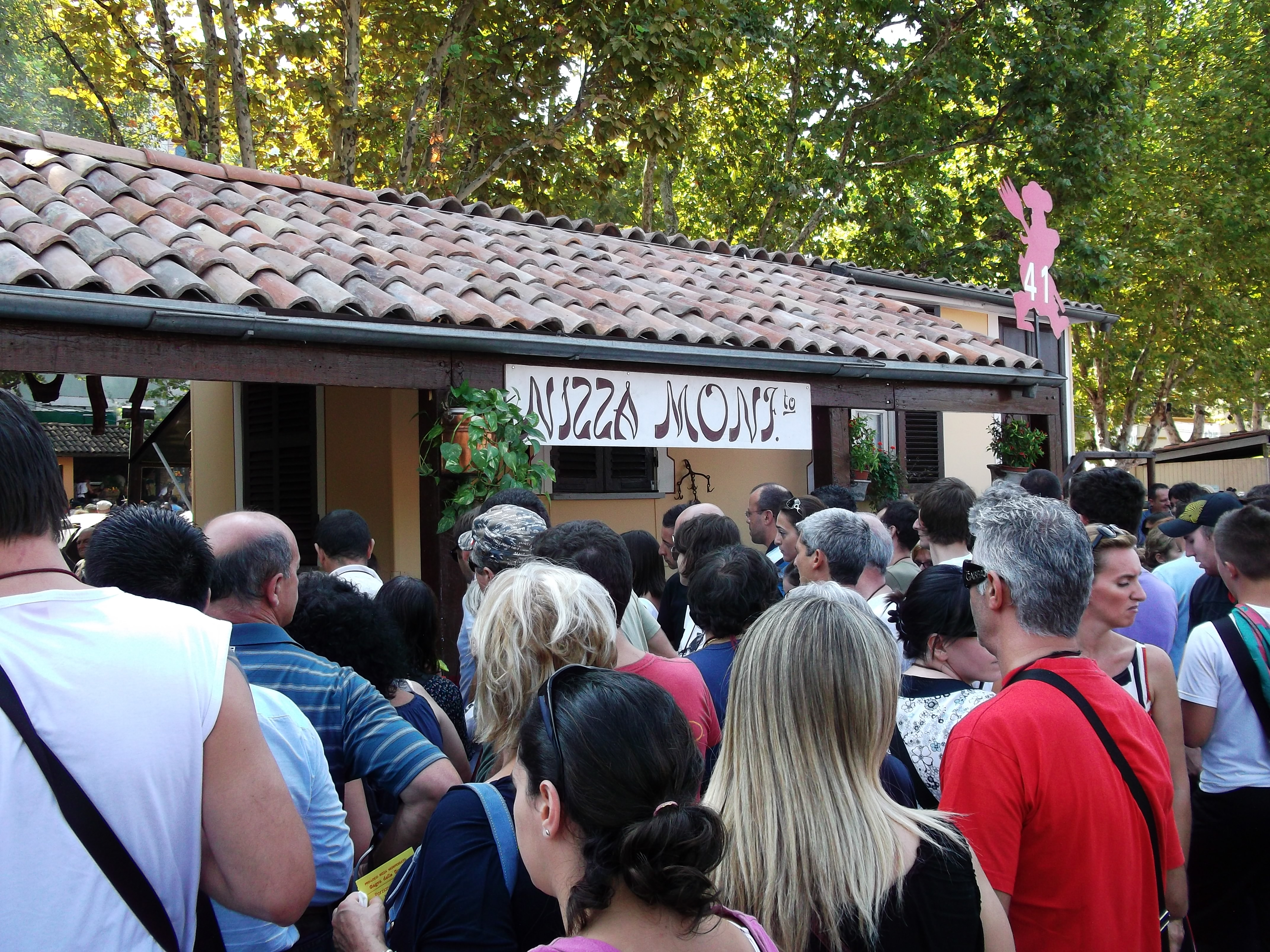
A popular Pro Loco

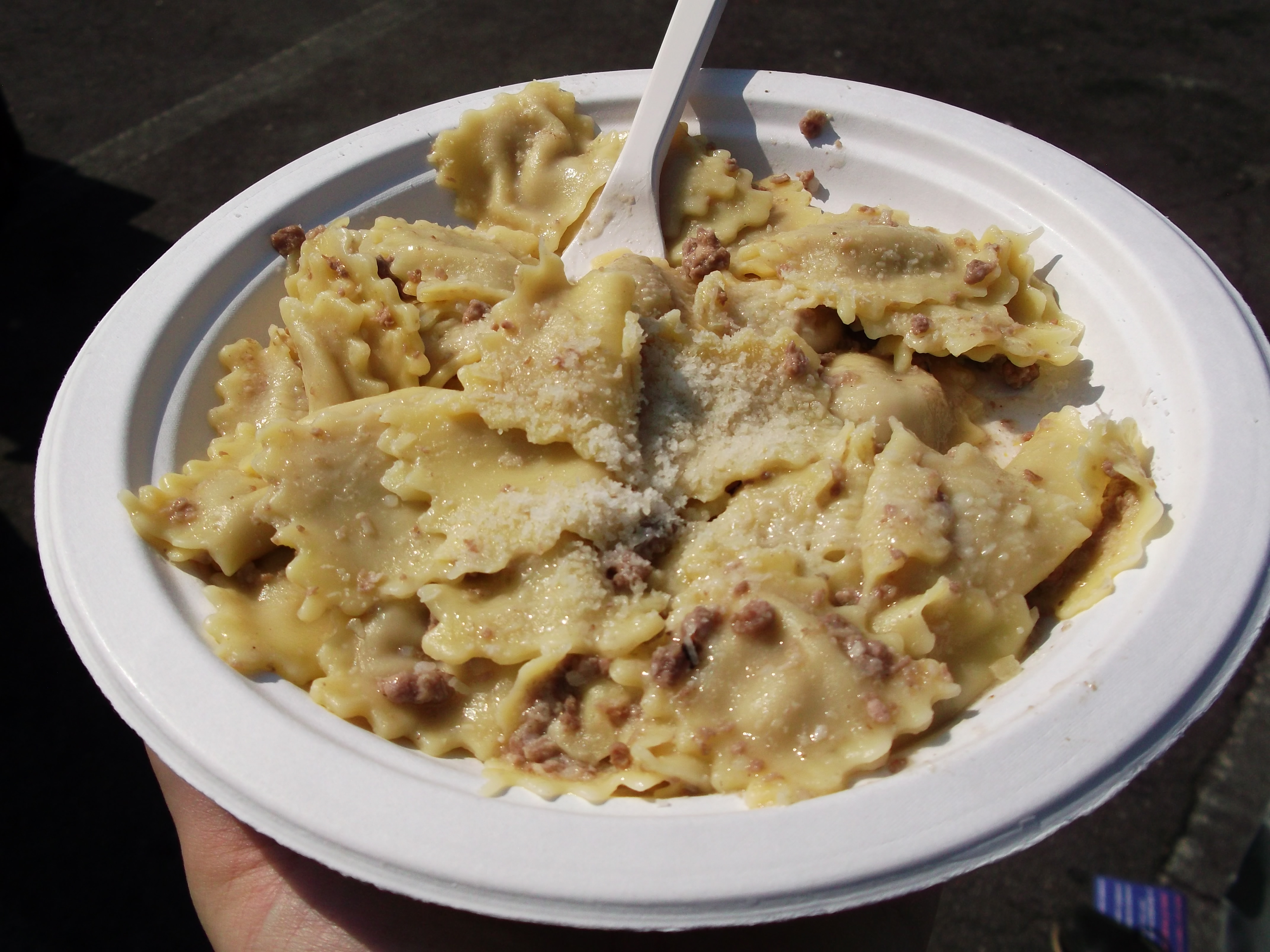
Agnolotti, a typical local dish

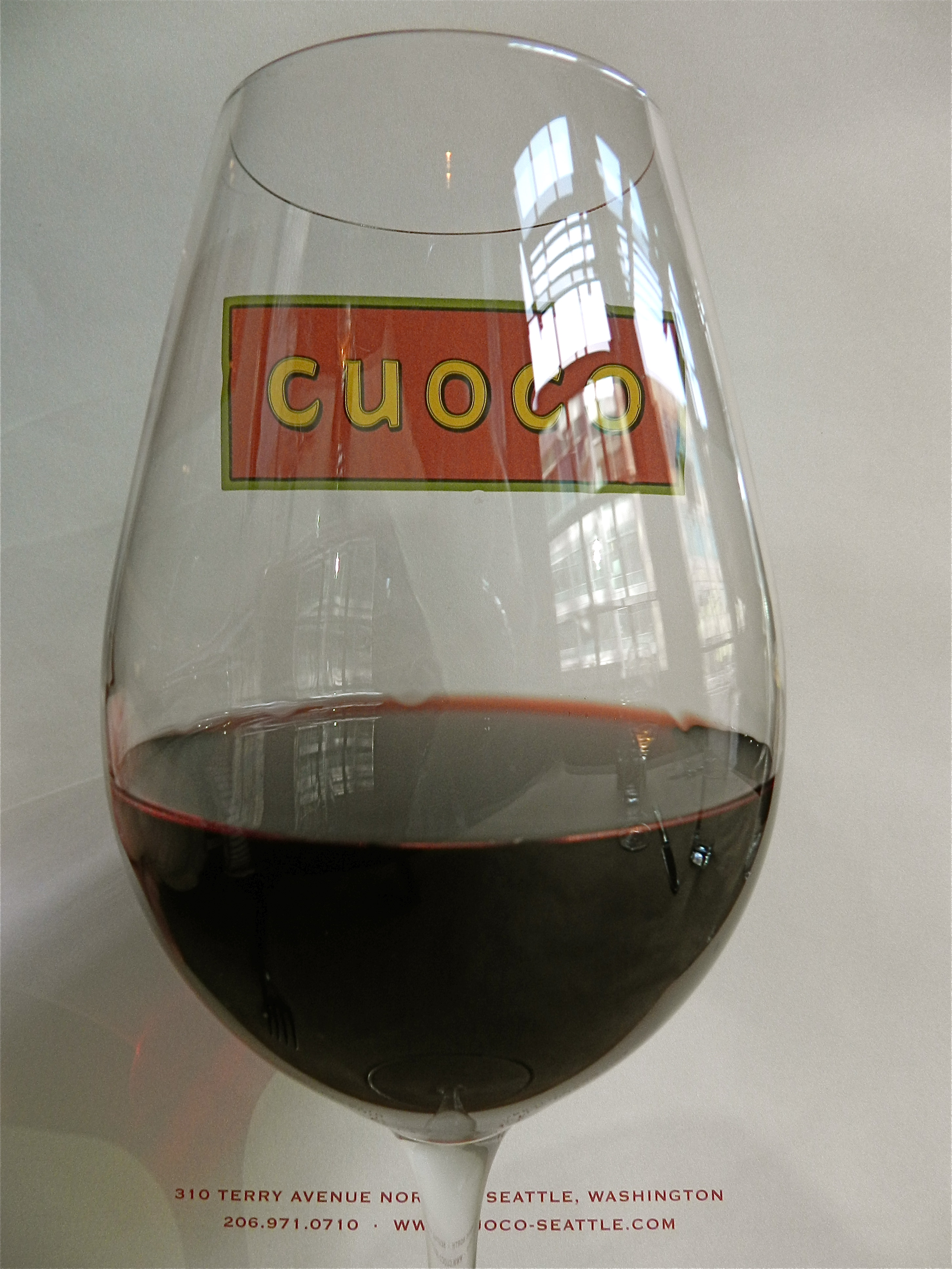
A glass of Barbera d'Asti, the official Sagre wine

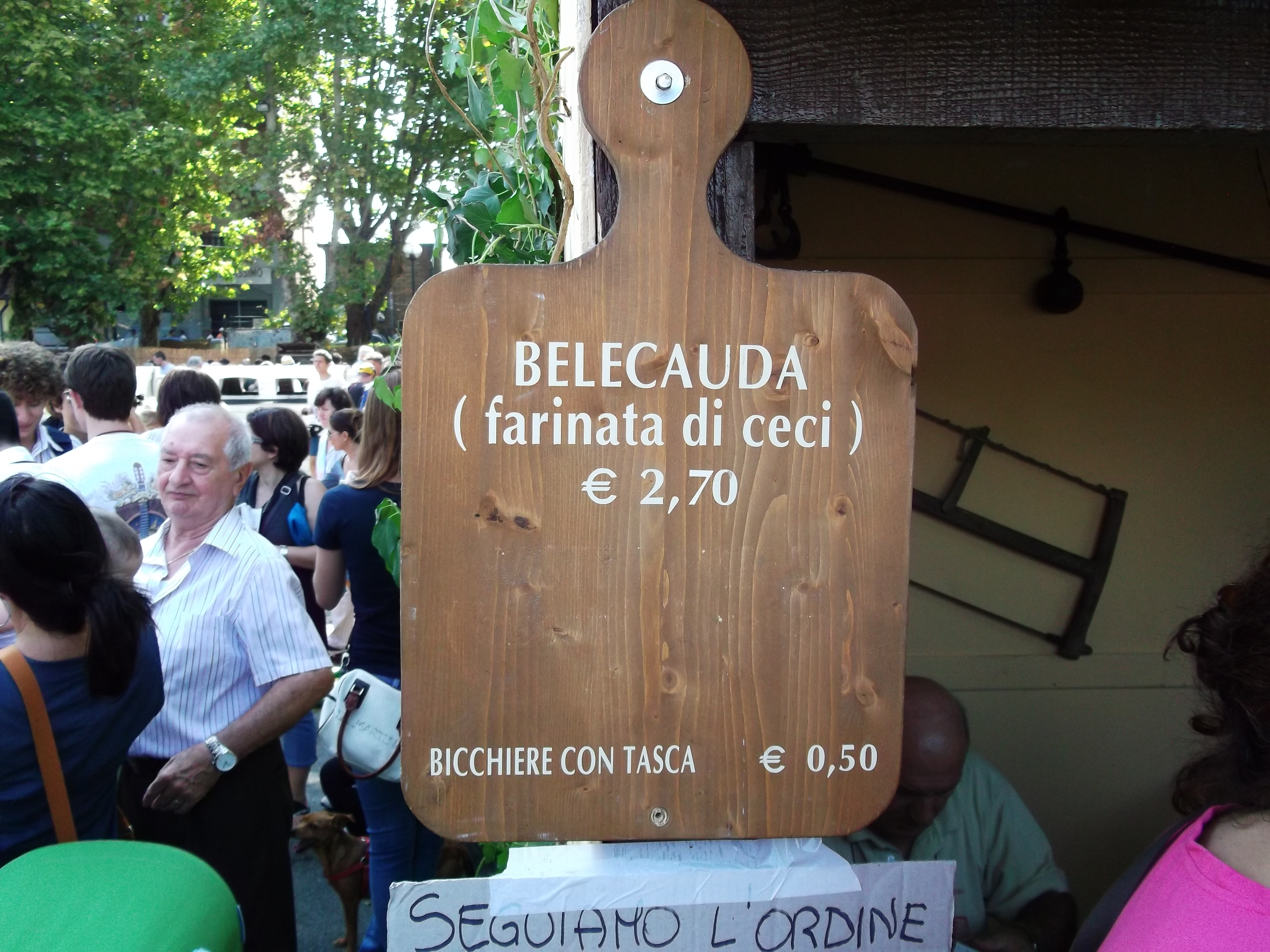
A price list

Both written and oral recipes created by generations of rural people are used each year to present a menu of over eighty different dishes, prepared using ingredients that are typical for the Asti region. Some are unusual, such as rice with Barbera d'Asti, Polenta with wild boar stew, rabbit agnolotti, fried bleak (alborelle – a type of fish), farinata (belecauda in Asti dialect of the Piedmontese language) or bollitto with bagnetto verde. Some dishes are prepared in almost industrial quantities – in 2004 over 4,000 kg of rabbit agnolotti were consumed – and are sold at affordable prices.

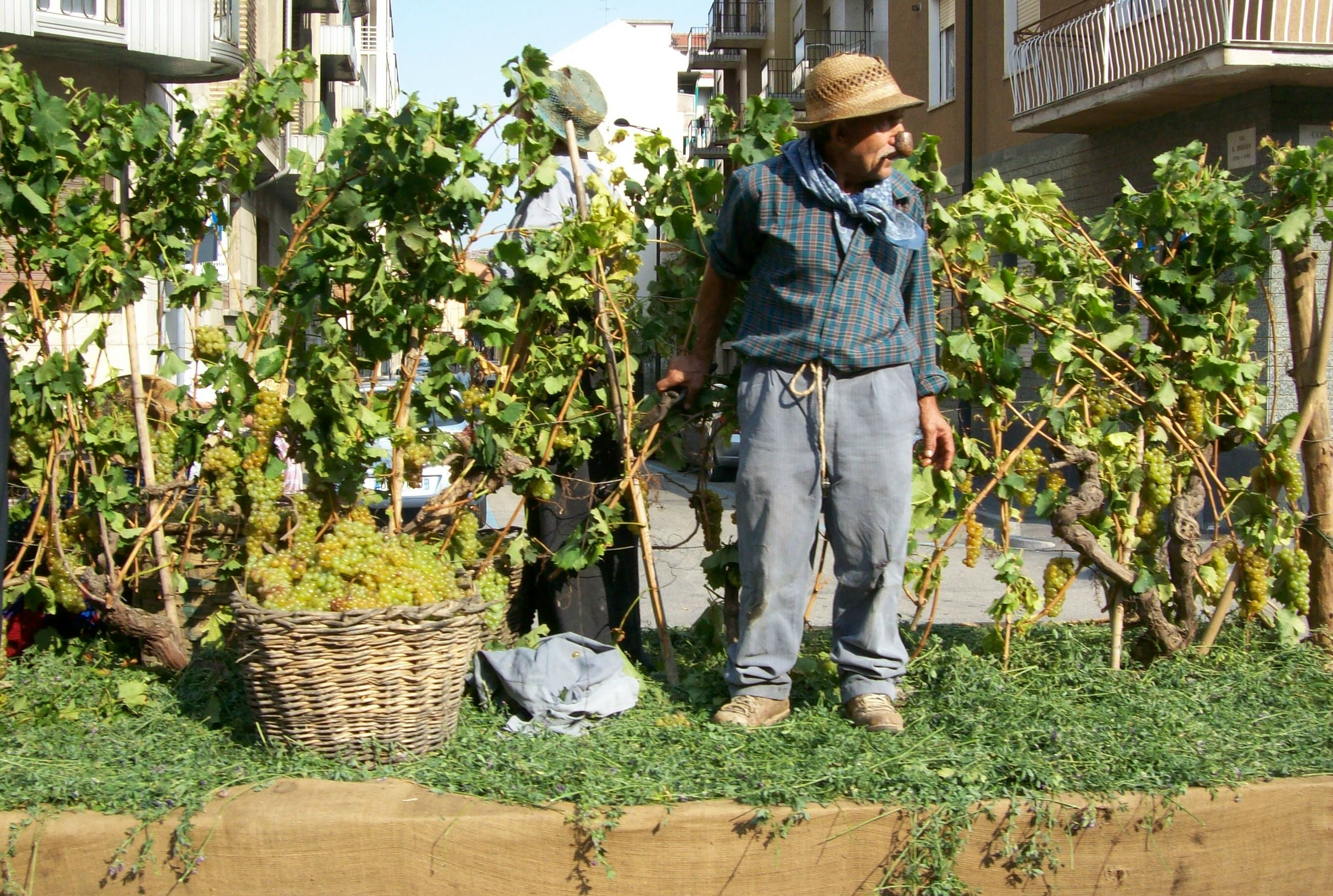
A character in the parade

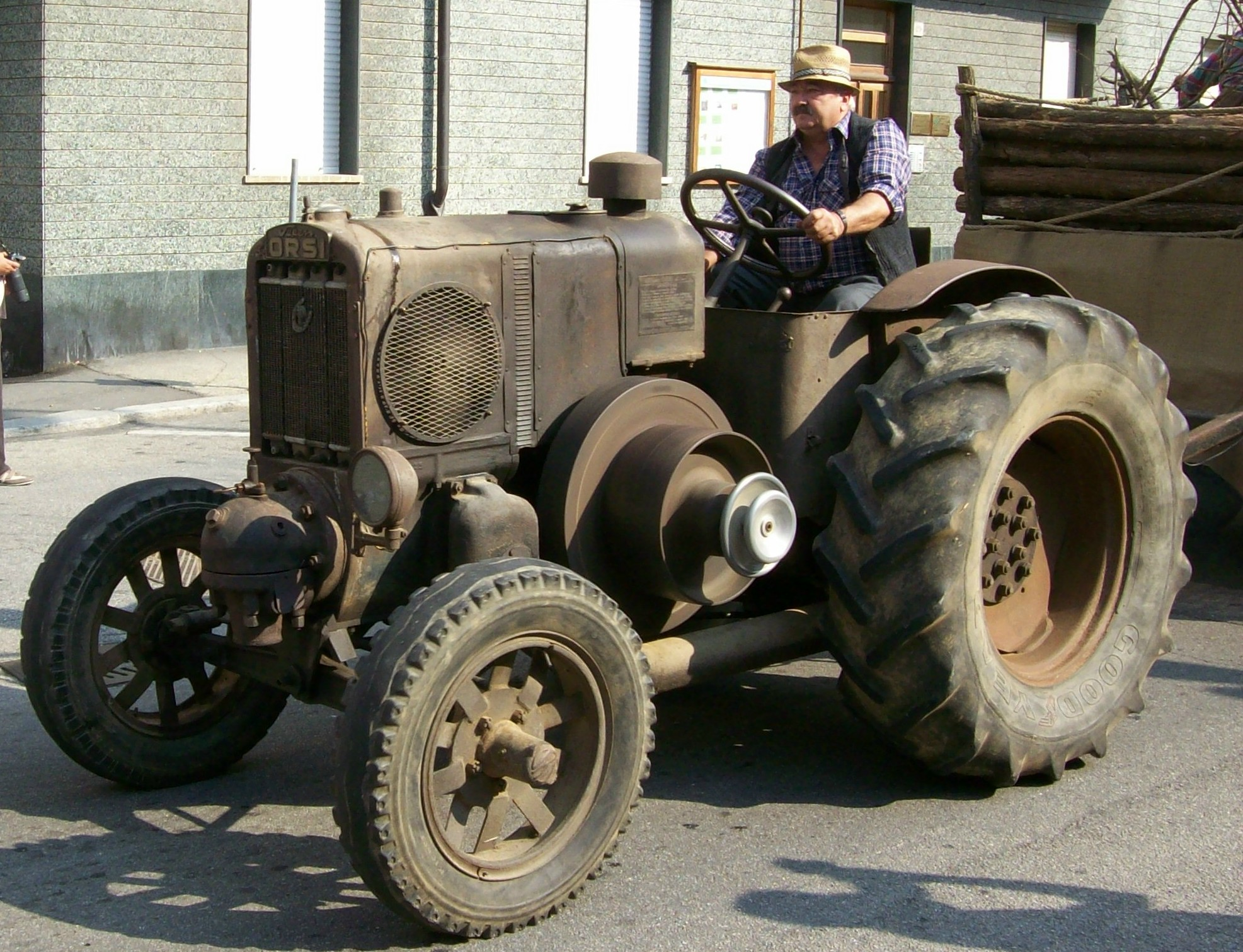
Antique tractor in the parade

== The parade ==
The Sunday event starts with a parade through the streets of Asti, depicting rural values and traditions of the province with more than 3,000 characters in authentic period costumes. The procession recreates scenes of peasant life, punctuated by the changing seasons, organized to resemble a living museum.

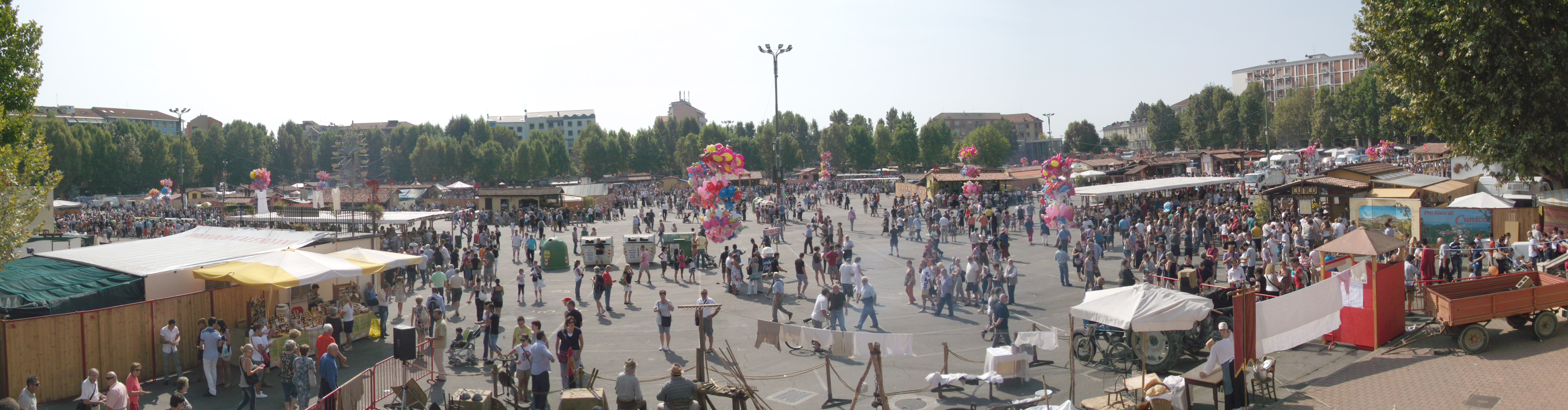
Panoramic view over the Piazza Campo del Palio during preparations for the festival
