= Vinchio =

- Comune
- Comune di Vinchio
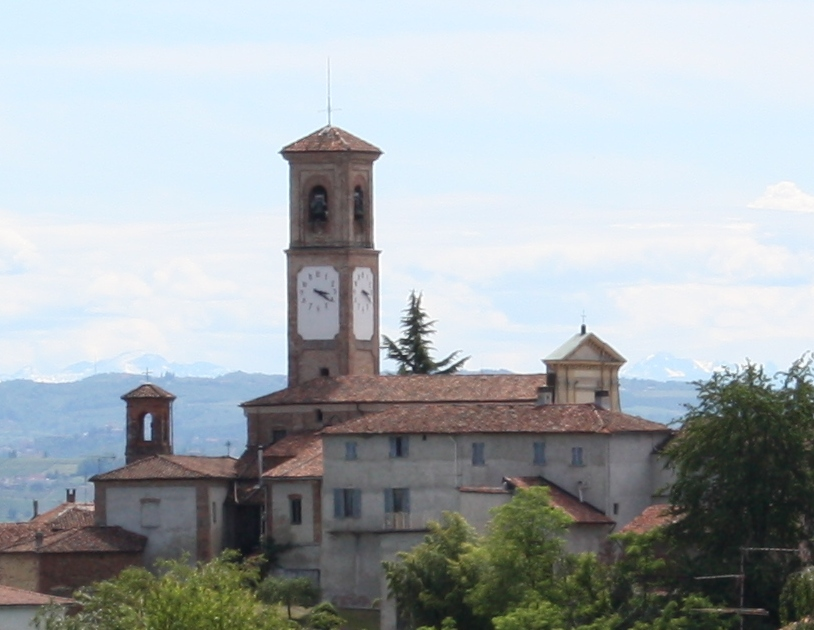

- Coat of arms

- Location within Italy Location within Piedmont
- Coordinates: 44°49′N 8°19′E
- Country: Italy
- Region: Piedmont
- Province: Asti (AT)
- Frazioni: Noche

Government
  - Mayor: Chiara Zogo

Area
  - Total: 9.29 km^{2} (3.59 sq mi)
- Elevation: 269 m (883 ft)

Population (31 December 2019)
  - Total: 567
  - Density: 61.0/km^{2} (158/sq mi)
- Demonym: Vinchiesi
- Time zone: UTC+1 (CET)
  - Summer (DST): UTC+2 (CEST)
- Postal code: 14040
- Dialing code: 0141
- Patron saint: St. Vincent
- Saint day: 22 January
- Website: Official website

Vinchio is a comune (municipality) in the Province of Asti in the Italian region Piedmont, located about 60 kilometres (37 mi) southeast of Turin and about 13 kilometres (8 mi) southeast of Asti.

Vinchio borders the following municipalities: Belveglio, Castelnuovo Calcea, Cortiglione, Mombercelli, Nizza Monferrato, and Vaglio Serra.
