= Cortiglione =

- Comune
- Comune di Cortiglione
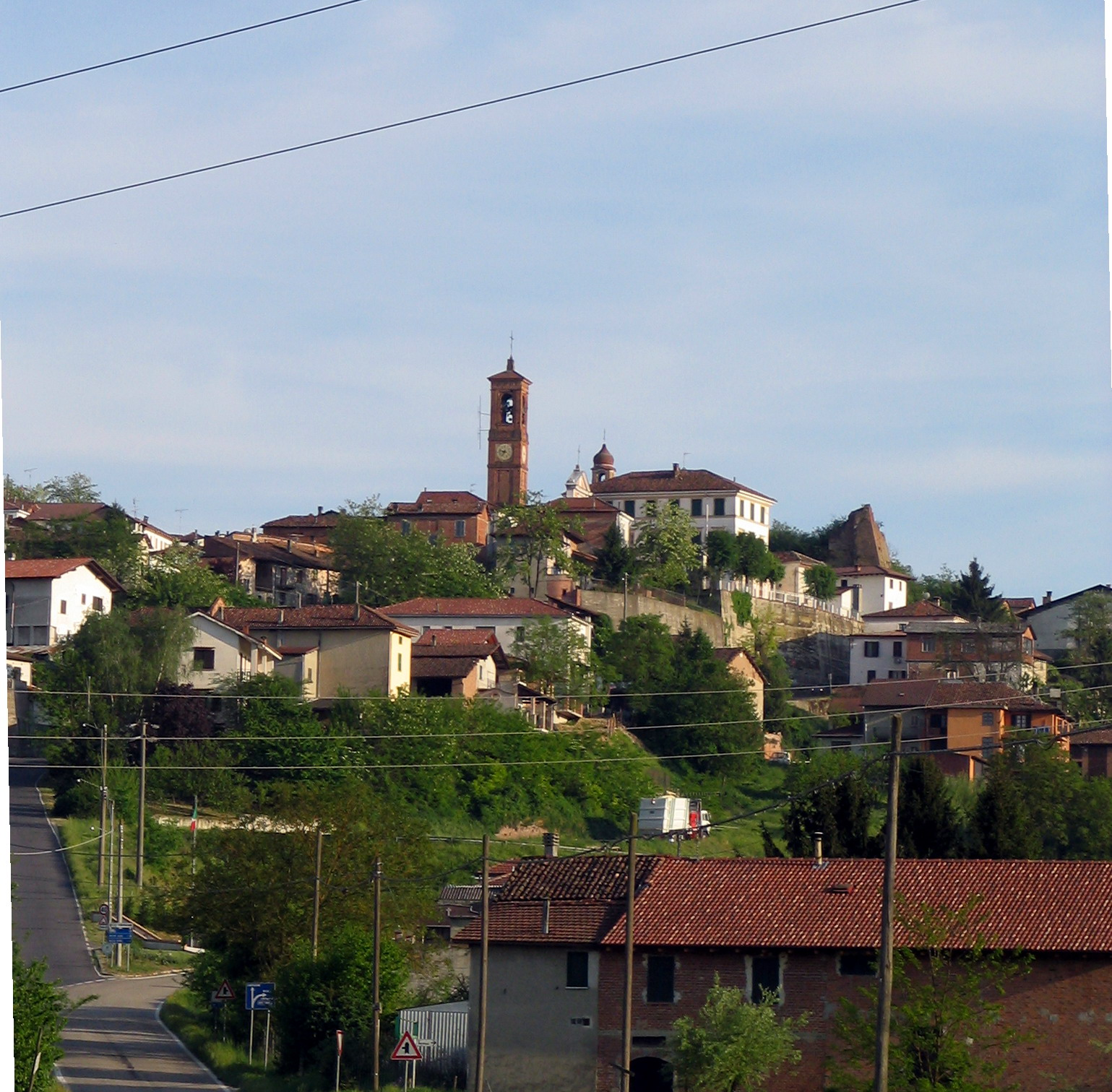
- View of Cortiglione

- Location within Italy Location within Piedmont
- Coordinates: 44°49′N 8°21′E
- Country: Italy
- Region: Piedmont
- Province: Asti (AT)

Government
  - Mayor: Gilio Brondolo

Area
  - Total: 8.4 km^{2} (3.2 sq mi)
- Elevation: 211 m (692 ft)

Population (30 November 2016)
  - Total: 571
  - Density: 68/km^{2} (180/sq mi)
- Demonym: Cortiglionesi
- Time zone: UTC+1 (CET)
  - Summer (DST): UTC+2 (CEST)
- Postal code: 14040
- Dialing code: 0141
- Website: Official website

Cortiglione is a comune (municipality) in the Province of Asti in the Italian region Piedmont, about 60 kilometres (37 mi) southeast of Turin and about 15 kilometres (9 mi) southeast of Asti.

Cortiglione borders the following municipalities: Belveglio, Incisa Scapaccino, Masio, Rocchetta Tanaro, Vaglio Serra, and Vinchio.
