= Incisa Scapaccino =

- Comune
- Comune di Incisa Scapaccino
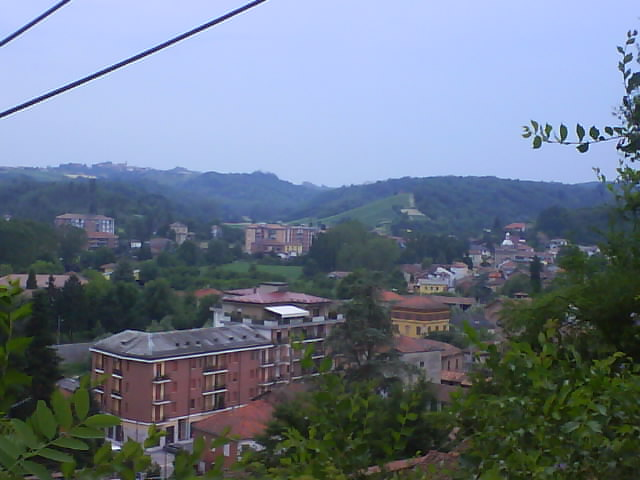
- Panorama

- Coat of arms

- Location within Italy Location within Piedmont
- Coordinates: 44°49′N 8°23′E
- Country: Italy
- Region: Piedmont
- Province: Asti (AT)

Government
  - Mayor: Maria Teresa Capra

Area
  - Total: 20.9 km^{2} (8.1 sq mi)
- Elevation: 131 m (430 ft)

Population (31 July 2010)
  - Total: 2,269
  - Density: 109/km^{2} (281/sq mi)
- Demonym: Incisiani
- Time zone: UTC+1 (CET)
  - Summer (DST): UTC+2 (CEST)
- Postal code: 14045
- Dialing code: 0141
- Website: Official website

Incisa Scapaccino (from 1863 to 1928 Incisa Belbo) is a comune (municipality) in the Province of Asti in the Italian region Piedmont, located about 60 kilometres (37 mi) southeast of Turin and about 15 kilometres (9 mi) southeast of Asti.

Incisa Scapaccino borders the following municipalities: Bergamasco, Castelnuovo Belbo, Cortiglione, Masio, Nizza Monferrato, Oviglio, and Vaglio Serra.

The town was the seat of an Aleramic marquisate from 1161 to 1548.

== Twin towns ==
Incisa Scapaccino is twinned with:

- Saint-Just-Chaleyssin, France (1972)
