= Vaglio Serra =

Vaglio Serra Vaglio Serra
- Comune
- Comune di Vaglio Serra

- Coat of arms
- Nickname: Vaj
- Location within Italy Location within Piedmont
- Coordinates: 44°48′N 8°20′E
- Country: Italy
- Region: Piedmont
- Province: Province of Asti (AT)
- Frazioni: Braglia, La Pietra, La Serra, Saborello, San Pancrazio

Government
  - Mayor: Cristiano Fornaro (Civic list (Italy) Per Voi)

Area
  - Total: 4.6 km^{2} (1.8 sq mi)
- Elevation: 278 m (912 ft)

Population (May 2025)
  - Total: 261
  - Density: 57/km^{2} (150/sq mi)
- Demonym: vagliesi
- Time zone: UTC+1 (CET)
  - Summer (DST): UTC+2 (CEST)
- Postal code: 14049
- Dialing code: 0141
- ISTAT code: 005111
- Patron saint: Pancras of Rome
- Saint day: 12 May
- Website: https://comune.vaglioserra.at.it/

Vaglio Serra (Vaj in Piedmontese language) is a comune (municipality) in the Province of Asti in the Italian region Piedmont, located about 60 kilometres (37 mi) southeast of Turin and about 15 kilometres (9 mi) southeast of Asti, measured in a straight line. As of 31 December 2004, it had a population of 293 and an area of 4.6 square kilometres (1.8 mi^{2}).

Vaglio Serra borders the following municipalities: Cortiglione, Incisa Scapaccino, Nizza Monferrato, and Vinchio. It is part of the UNESCO World Heritage Site Vineyard Landscape of Piedmont: Langhe-Roero and Monferrato

== Demographic evolution ==
Historical population

Year	Pop.	±%
1861	632	—
1871	640	+1.3%
1881	656	+2.5%
1901	789	+20.3%
1911	738	−6.5%

Year	Pop.	±%
1921	684	−7.3%
1931	620	−9.4%
1936	638	+2.9%
1951	582	−8.8%
1961	453	−22.2%

Year	Pop.	±%
1971	379	−16.3%
1981	296	−21.9%
1991	273	−7.8%
2001	298	+9.2%

Source: Data from ISTAT
