= Chatus (wine grape) =

Variety of grape

- Grape (Vitis)
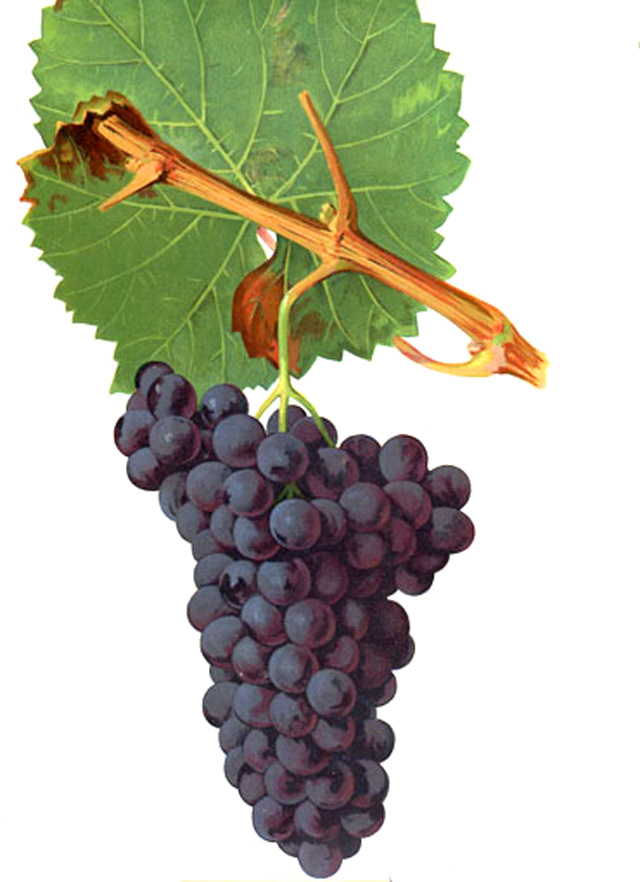
- Species: Vitis vinifera
- Origin: France
- Notable regions: Ardèche
- VIVC number: 22650

Chatus is a red wine grape variety native to Ardèche, France.

== History ==
Before the Phylloxera epidemic, Chatus was grown primarily in the sandy soils of Bas-Vivarais, though scattered plantings could also be found in Drôme and Isère. The vines were traditionally grown on meter-high terraces, each supporting autin-trained vines. This form of training was very labor-intensive, often taking three to four times as much work as other vines to maintain. The wines created from Chatus were sought after in their own right, but they were also often boiled in order to sell to locals, a process which improved the color while damaging the flavor of the wine.

In 1880, the Phylloxera epidemic destroyed most of the vineyards in the area, and Chatus was largely replaced with more manageable, well-known wines. What little vines remained were grafted on to American root stocks and Jacquez, and maintained until experimental wine making and replanting efforts were launched in 1989 and 1991, respectively. While the wine is still little-known outside of Ardèche, an ONIVINS request for reclassification was obtained in 1997, and in 2000 growers set a limit of 50 hectolitres per hectare in the Cévennes, which were replanted with the variety.

== Distribution and wines ==
Chatus is presently grown exclusively in the area surrounding Ardèche. The grape can produce wines with brilliant color and complex aromas of medlar and overripe fruit. Wines made from Chatus tend to be intense and tannic when young, and were historically blended with Courbès, a now extinct native Ardèche varietal, to add acidity and alcohol. It is recommended to be aged five years before drinking.

== Vine and viticulture ==
The vine is upright, vigorous, and prefers high altitudes and siliceous soils, especially the detrital ridges south of the Massif Central. Its susceptibility to diseases increases when grown on calcareous soils, especially mildew and powdery mildew. It ripens in mid-October.

The clusters are compact, large, elongated and conical, without wings, though sometimes with a secondary cluster. The berries are round, uniform, small, and deep black with bluish bloom. Their pulp is green, tart, and sweet with no distinctive smell.
