= Belveglio =

- Comune
- Comune di Belveglio
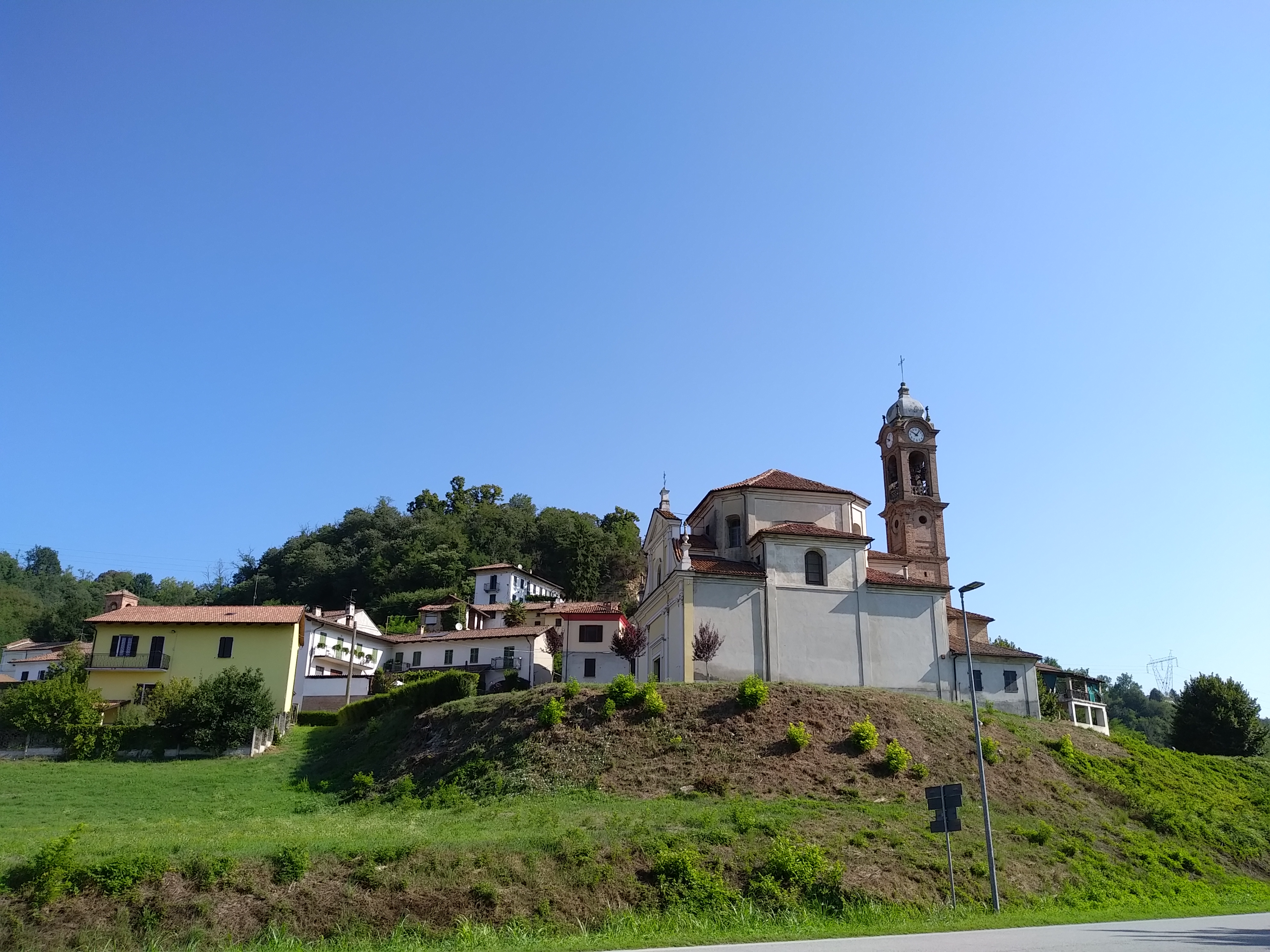
- View of Belveglio

- Coat of arms

- Location within Italy Location within Piedmont
- Coordinates: 44°50′N 8°20′E
- Country: Italy
- Region: Piedmont
- Province: Asti (AT)

Government
  - Mayor: Michela Kretaz

Area
  - Total: 5.4 km^{2} (2.1 sq mi)
- Elevation: 141 m (463 ft)

Population (30 November 2016)
  - Total: 343
  - Density: 64/km^{2} (160/sq mi)
- Demonym: Belvegliesi
- Time zone: UTC+1 (CET)
  - Summer (DST): UTC+2 (CEST)
- Postal code: 14040
- Dialing code: 0141

Belveglio is a comune (municipality) in the Province of Asti in the Italian region Piedmont, located about 60 kilometres (37 mi) southeast of Turin and about 13 kilometres (8 mi) southeast of Asti. Belveglio borders the following municipalities: Cortiglione, Mombercelli, Rocchetta Tanaro, and Vinchio.
