= Castelnuovo Calcea =

- Comune
- Comune di Castelnuovo Calcea
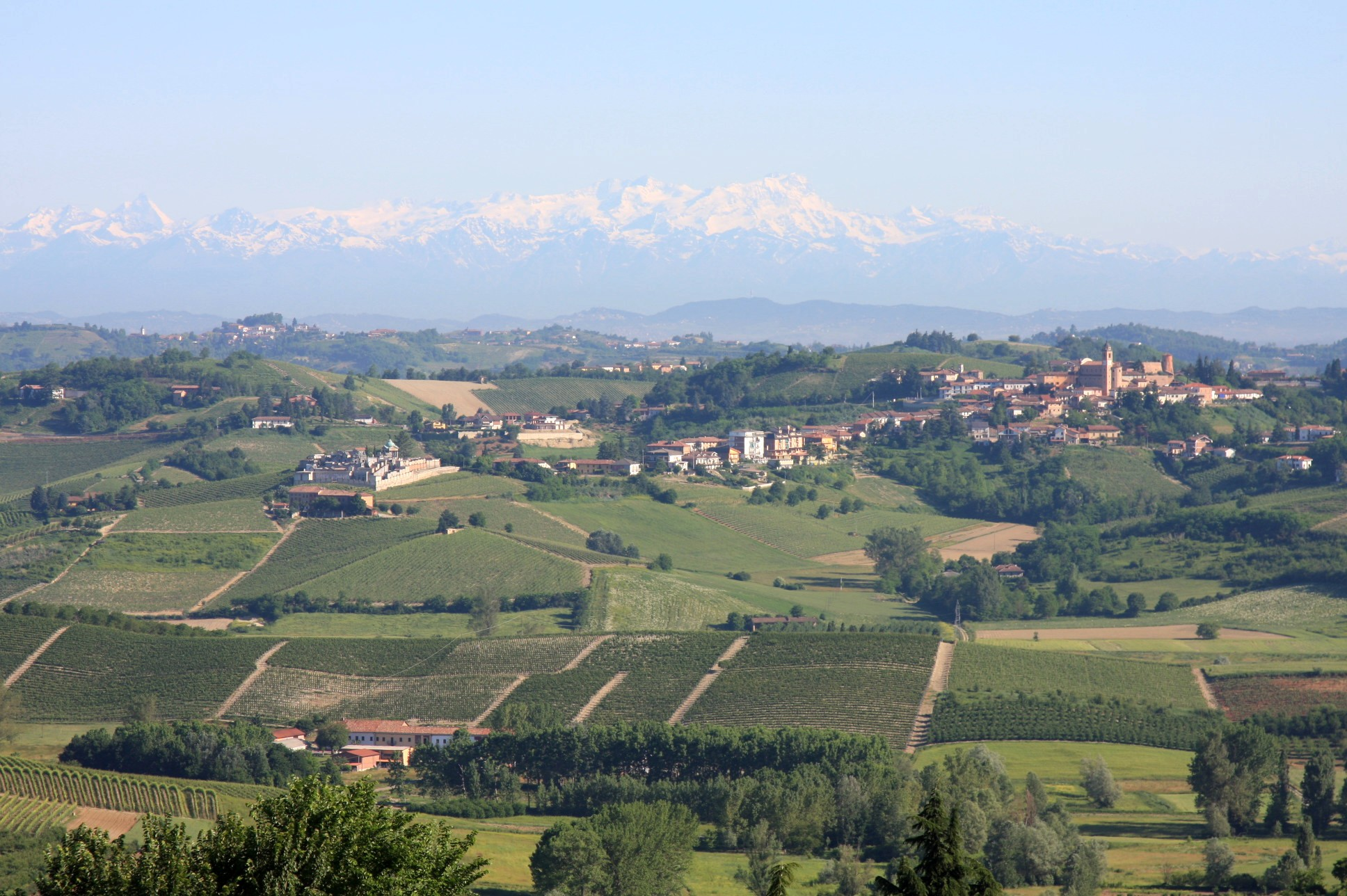
- View of Castelnuovo Calcea

- Coat of arms

- Location within Italy Location within Piedmont
- Coordinates: 44°47′N 8°17′E
- Country: Italy
- Region: Piedmont
- Province: Asti (AT)

Government
  - Mayor: Roberto Guastello

Area
  - Total: 8.2 km^{2} (3.2 sq mi)
- Elevation: 246 m (807 ft)

Population (30 December 2019)
  - Total: 726
  - Density: 89/km^{2} (230/sq mi)
- Demonym: Castelnuovesi
- Time zone: UTC+1 (CET)
  - Summer (DST): UTC+2 (CEST)
- Postal code: 14040
- Dialing code: 0141
- Patron saint: St. Stephen
- Saint day: 26 December
- Website: Official website

Castelnuovo Calcea is a comune (municipality) in the Province of Asti in the Italian region Piedmont, located about 60 kilometres (37 mi) southeast of Turin and about 15 kilometres (9 mi) southeast of Asti.

== Main sights ==
- Parish church, built in the late 17th century
- Medieval castle, destroyed by Savoyard troops in 1634. Today only the entrance gate and a tower remain.
