= Asti wine =

Italian sparkling white wine

Asti
- Wine region
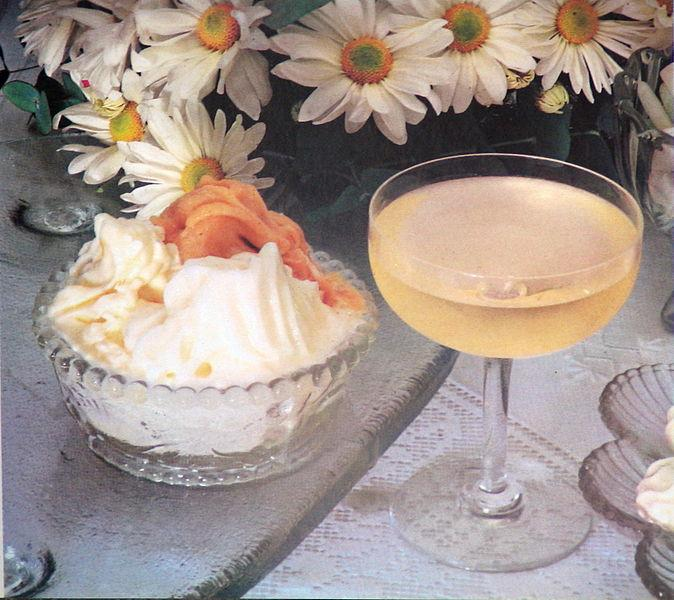
- A glass of Asti
- Type: DOCG
- Year established: 1967 (DOC; elevated to DOCG 1993)
- Country: Italy
- Part of: Piedmont
- Sub-regions: Canelli, Santa Vittoria d’Alba, Strevi
- Size of planted vineyards: 7,770 hectares (19,200 acres)
- Varietals produced: Moscato Bianco
- Wine produced: 665,790 hectolitres (14,645,000 imp gal; 17,588,000 US gal)

Asti (also known as Asti spumante) is a sparkling white Italian wine that is produced throughout southeastern Piedmont, but is particularly focused around the towns of Asti and Alba. Since 1993 the wine has been classified as a denominazione di origine controllata e garantita (DOCG) and as of 2004 was Italy's largest producing appellation. On an average vintage more than ten times as much Asti is produced in Piedmont than the more well-known Piedmontese red wine Barolo.

Made from the Moscato Bianco grape, it is sweet and low in alcohol, and often served with dessert. Unlike Champagne, Asti is not made sparkling through the use of secondary fermentation in the bottle, but rather through a single tank fermentation utilizing the Charmat method. It retains its sweetness through a complex filtration process. Another wine called Moscato d'Asti is made in the same region from the same grape, but is only slightly sparkling (frizzante) and tends to have even lower alcohol.

On 22 June 2014, Vineyard Landscape of Piedmont: Langhe-Roero and Monferrato was declared a UNESCO World Heritage Site. This landscape covers five distinct wine-growing areas and the Castle of Cavour, an important site both in the development of vineyards and in Italian history.

== History ==
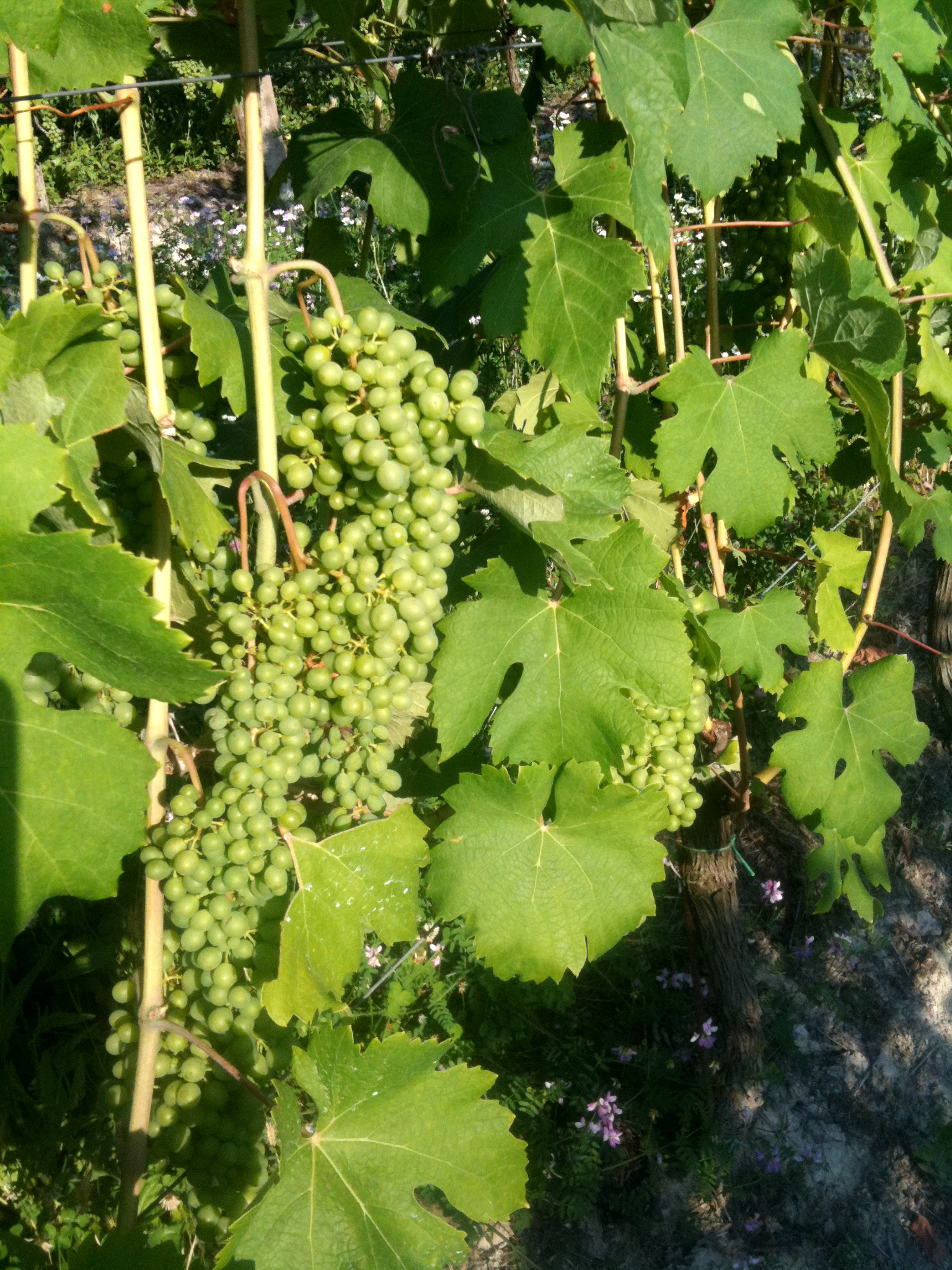
Moscato bianco grapes (pre-veraison)

The Moscato Bianco grape (also known as Muscat Blanc à Petits Grains) has long been found in the Piedmont and, along with Nebbiolo, may be one of the oldest grapes in the region. However, the production of sparkling Asti from Moscato Bianco is a relatively recent product. The first sparkling Asti is believed to have been produced around 1870 by Carlo Gancia who studied the Champagne method used to produce the notable wine in the Champagne wine region of France. Producing his wine in the town of Canelli along the river Belbo, the wine grew in such popularity that Moscato Bianco developed the synonym of Muscat Canelli that is still seen on wine labels today.

After World War II, Asti saw an uptick in popularity in the United States as returning soldiers from the war brought their taste for the light, sweet wine home with them. The increasing demand saw many producers turn to bulk wine production using the Charmat method, which makes the wine sparkling through a closed fermentation in a tank rather than a secondary fermentation the individual bottle as in Champagne and Cava. The large amounts of exported Asti (then known as Asti Spumante) that hit the export market (to both the United States as well as the United Kingdom) garnered a poor reputation for being what wine expert Karen MacNeil describes as "a noxiously sweet poor man's Champagne."

Remnants of this reputation remained attached to the name Asti Spumante for much of the 20th century. When the wine was promoted to DOCG status in 1993, producers sought to distinguish themselves from that reputation and dropped the use of Spumante altogether in favor of the shortened Asti name. Along with the name change came a change in style, with several producers creating more modern styles of Asti that are less sweet and have more ripe fruit flavors.

== Production zone ==
The provinces of Piedmont with the Asti producing provinces of Cuneo, Asti and Alessandria located in the southeast.

Asti is produced in the southeastern region of Piedmont where the large concentration of rolling hills provides ample space for vineyard plantings. The DOCG production zone is located mostly in the Province of Asti and partly within the provinces of Cuneo and Alessandria.

=== Original definition ===
The area was first defined in 1932 as comprising the following 45 communes:

In Asti: Asti, Bubbio, Calamandrana, Calosso, Canelli, Cassinasco, Castagnole delle Lanze, Castel Boglione, Castel Rocchero, Castelnuovo Belbo, Cessole, Coazzolo, Costigliole d'Asti, Fontanile, Incisa Scapaccino, Loazzolo, Maranzana, Moasca, Mombaruzzo, Monastero Bormida, Montabone, Nizza Monferrato, Quaranti, San Marzano Oliveto, Sessame and Vesime.

In Cuneo: Camo, Castiglione Tinella, Cossano Belbo, Mango, Neive, Neviglie, Rocchetta Belbo, Santo Stefano Belbo, Treiso and Trezzo Tinella.

In Alessandria: Acqui Terme, Alice Bel Colle, Bistagno, Cassine, Castelletto Molina, Grognardo, Ricaldone, Strevi, Terzo and Visone.

The province of Cuneo is more mountainous than the other provinces and has fewer vineyards that are concentrated closer to the Po Valley. The Monferrato Hills that extend from the Po southward towards the Apennines covers much of the vineyard area in the Asti and Alessandria area with the name Monferrato sometimes appearing on bottles of Asti.

=== Expansion ===
In 1967 the zone was extended to include the communes of Rocchetta Palafea in Asti, Alba, Santa Vittoria d'Alba and Serralunga d'Alba in Cuneo.

Since 1976 production of the wine has additionally been permitted in the communes of Castino and Perletto in Cuneo as well as San Giorgio Scarampi in Asti.

== DOCG regulations and production ==
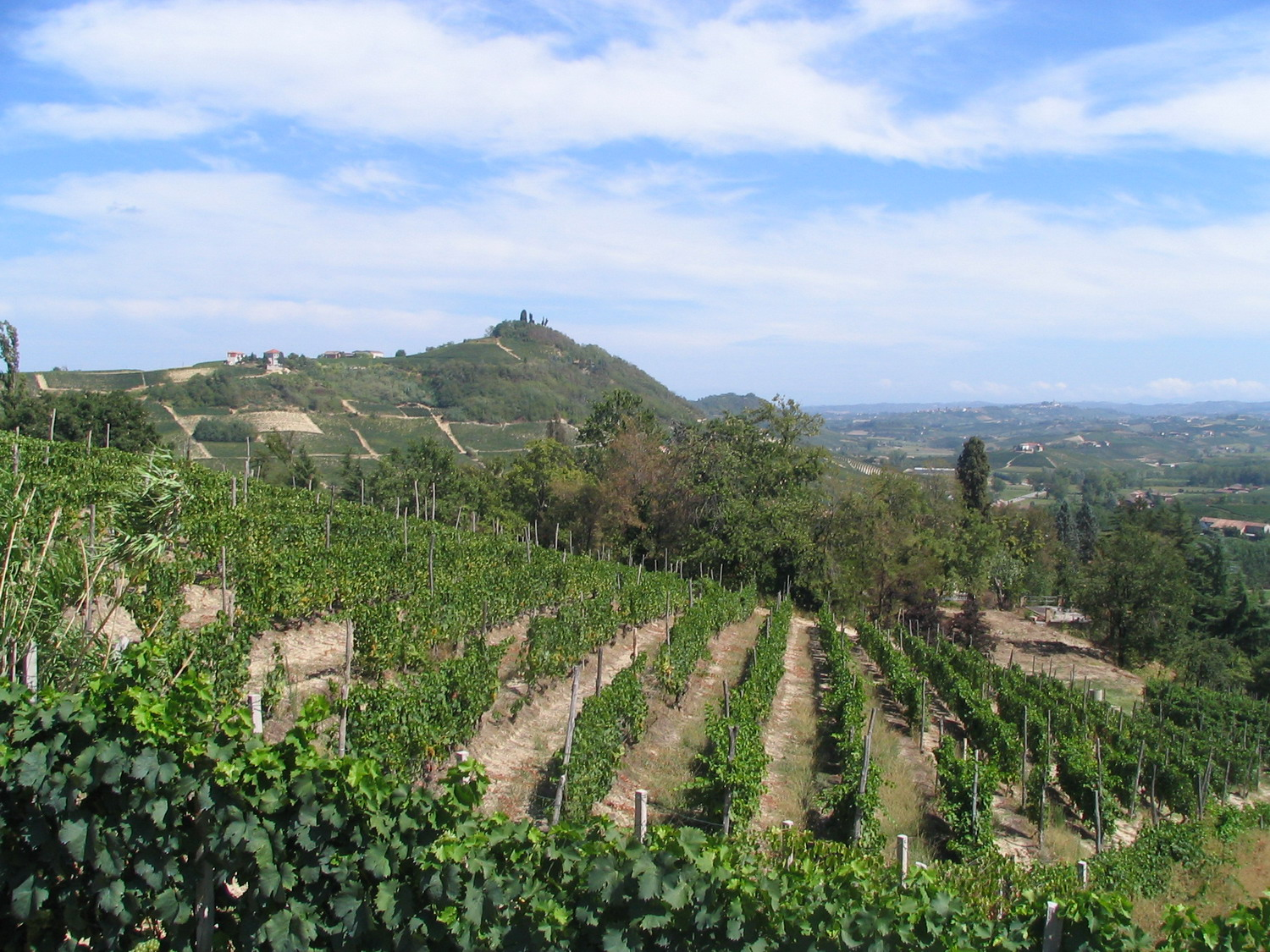
Vineyards in the Asti producing commune of Costigliole d'Asti

Under Italian wine laws, all Asti DOCG wine must be 100% made from the Moscato Bianco grape with the grapes harvested to a yield no greater than 10 tonnes/hectare. The finished wine must be fermented to a minimum alcohol level that varies depending on the vintage and is usually between 7-9.5%.

Asti get their fizziness from a single fermentation that takes place in stainless steel tanks (as opposed to a secondary fermentation taking place in a wine bottle like Champagne). After the grapes are harvested, they are crushed and pressed, with the must transferred to large tanks where the temperature is lowered to just above freezing in order to prevent fermentation from beginning. The tanks are sealed and pressurized, and then the temperature is raised to allow fermentation to begin.

Within the tanks the carbon dioxide by-product of fermentation is trapped with the gas dissolving into the wine and creating the ultimate source of the bubbles that are seen in a wine glass. Fermentation is allowed to continue until the wine has reached between 7-9% alcohol and between 3-5% residual sugar. The wine is chilled again to halt fermentation before it is sent to a centrifuge that filters and removes all yeast from the wine to prevent fermentation from resuming. The wine is then bottled and shipped.

Most Asti is not vintage-dated, however the large consumption and quick turnover of the wine usually means that the wines on the market are from the most recent vintage.

== Wine styles ==
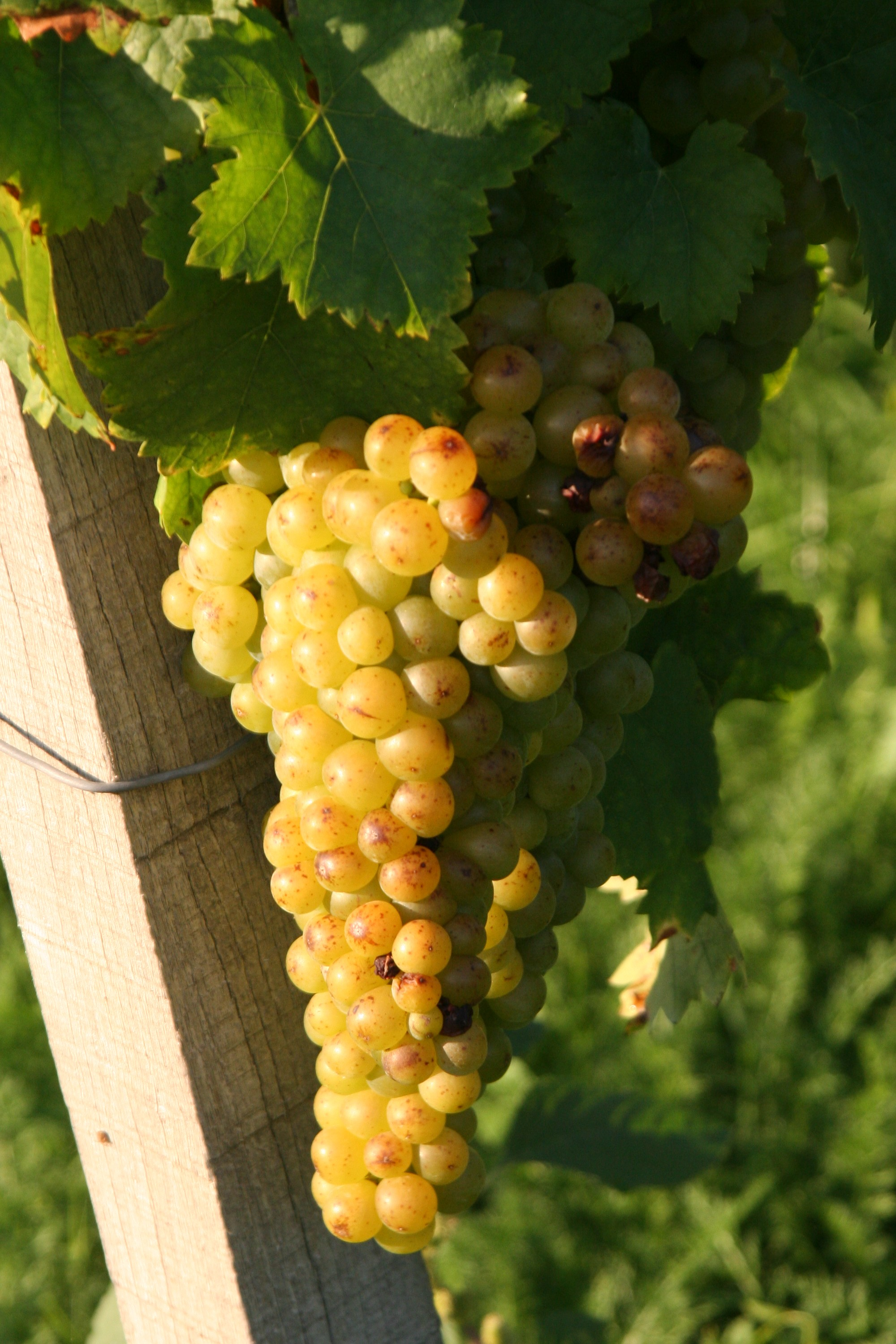
Ripe Moscato bianco grapes.

Master of Wine Mary Ewing-Mulligan notes that many of the flavors of Asti wine can be tasted in the ripe grapes of Moscato bianco. This is somewhat unusual in wine since many of the flavors of a finished wine come from phenolic compounds in the pulp and skin that develop in the wine through fermentation and maceration of the skins. In describing a finished Asti wine, Ewing-Mulligan notes that the wines usually have very floral aromas with peach flavors and enough acidity to balance out the sweetness in the wine.

According to wine expert Karen MacNeil modern Asti wines have the characteristic "muskiness" of a Muscat based wine but are "not sugary sweet like candy but, rather, dizzyingly fruity and evocative of perfectly ripe peaches and apricots." The wines are typically served chilled and in a champagne flute style glass.

Asti is often consumed very young and as close to the vintage as possible. After two years, the wine rapidly loses the fresh, floral notes and becomes heavier and richer in body. While still drinkable, older Asti tends not to exhibit the typical light, fruity flavors that are usually associated with the wine.

Despite its sweetness, Asti has enough acidity to be versatile in food and wine pairings. While it is often drunk as an aperitif, it can be paired with salads, spicy Asian cuisine and even, as wine expert Oz Clarke notes, with Christmas pudding.
