= Calosso =

- Comune
- Comune di Calosso
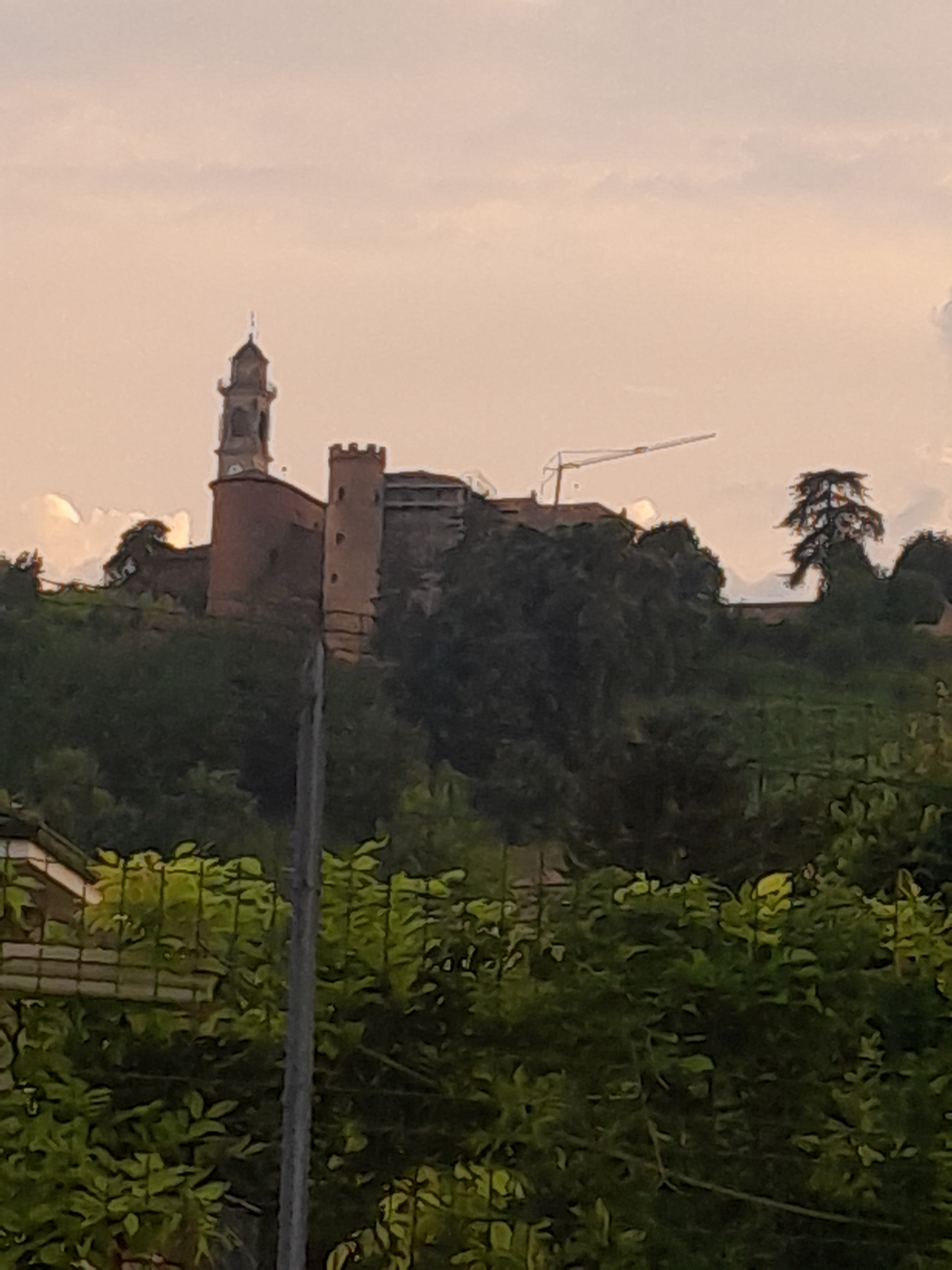
- View of Calosso

- Coat of arms

- Location of Calosso in Italy Calosso (Piedmont)
- Coordinates: 44°44′N 8°14′E
- Country: Italy
- Region: Piedmont
- Province: Province of Asti (AT)
- Frazioni: frazione Castagna, frazione Piana del Salto, frazione Mosiano, regione Rodotiglia, regione San Bovo, regione Soria

Government
  - Mayor: Migliardi Pier Francesco (elected 26 maggio 2019> (Vivere e Migliorare Insieme)

Area
  - Total: 15.7 km^{2} (6.1 sq mi)
- Elevation: 235 m (771 ft)
- Highest elevation: 399 m (1,309 ft)
- Lowest elevation: 155 m (509 ft)

Population (Jan. 2024)
  - Total: 1,112
  - Density: 70.8/km^{2} (183/sq mi)
- Demonym: Calossesi
- Time zone: UTC+1 (CET)
  - Summer (DST): UTC+2 (CEST)
- Postal code: 14052
- Dialing code: 0141
- ISTAT code: 005015
- Patron saint: Beato Alessandro Sauli
- Saint day: 11 October
- Website: Official website

Calosso is a rural comune (municipality) in the Province of Asti in the Italian region Piedmont, located about 60 kilometres (37 mi) southeast of Turin and about 20 kilometres (12 mi) south of Asti in the hilly area between the Tanaro and Belbo and on the borders between Monferrato and Langa. As of 31 January 2024, it had a population of 1,112 and an area of 15.7 square kilometres (6.1 mi^{2}).

The comune borders the following municipalities: Agliano Terme, Canelli, Castiglione Tinella, Costigliole d'Asti, Moasca, and Santo Stefano Belbo.

The village itself, together with its castle, stands on a hill surrounded by the vineyards which represent its principal economic activity.

== Culture ==
=== Rapulé ===
The municipal administration of Calosso organizes the Rapulé Fair every year, which generally takes place on the third weekend of October and takes its name from the harvesting operation of the "rapulìn": the gathering of smaller bunches that remain after the harvest of the grape. The festival offers a food and wine tour with tasting of wines and typical dishes among the crotìn, the cellars dug into the tuff that store the best wine. The village of the town is animated for two days by music, exhibitions and theatrical events. The Rapulé Fair is the ideal opportunity to visit the Calosso Castle, kindly opened for the occasion by the owners, the Baroque Church and the restored wooden choir of the Parish of San Martino and the four ancient staircases of the historic center.

== History ==
The first document in which the town is mentioned is an act from 960 which cites a certain Arimanno de Calocio as a witness to an exchange of land by Brunengo, Bishop of Asti between 934 and 964. At the beginning of the 12th century Calosso became part of the consortium of Acquosana together with the lords of Agliano, Vinchio, Canelli, San Marzano and Castelnuovo Calcea. Consortium created to protect the minor fiefdoms from the expansionist aims of the abstention families (such as the Asinari, the Roero, the Solaro, the Natta etc.).

In 1318 the municipality was involved in the phases of the civil war that broke out in the Asti district between the Solaro Guelphs and the De Castello Ghibellines. The Guelphs, in addition to the castle of Moasca, also destroyed the castrum of Calosso which was immediately rebuilt. Towards the end of the independence of the Free Municipality of Asti and precisely in 1377, the entire fiefdom of Calosso was purchased by the noble banker from Asti Percivalle Roero. Ten years later, in 1387, we find Calosso among the possessions of the dowry of Valentina Visconti, who married Louis of Orléans. Following the marriage, the county of Asti becomes entirely a French possession. One hundred and fifty years of French domination will follow. In 1531 Calosso, with the County of Asti, became part of the territories controlled by the Savoys and with the beginning of the VII century and the War of the Monferrato Succession, it was involved in an endless series of occupations by the various passing armies. In fact, at the beginning of the 17th century, Calosso was besieged by the Spanish and later recovered by the Savoys, thanks also to Captain Catalano Alfieri who, at the head of the French troops, had the entire castle surrounded by enormous palisades.

Fortunately, with the Peace of the Pyrenees in 1659, Calosso lost its strategic importance and its castle, from an imposing sixteenth-century fortress, was transformed into a country residence of the Roero family

=== Symbols ===
The coat of arms and banner of the municipality of Calosso were granted by decree of the President of the Republic of 19 July 1999.

To the cross of Asti is accompanied by a wheel, symbol of the Roero family.

=== Monuments ===
==== The castle of Calosso ====
For more than a millennium its imposing silhouette has watched over the town of Calosso from the top of the hill that rises between the Nizza and Tinella valleys. A long-lived testimony to the events that occurred in this small village, the castle marks its history through the ages, which can be traced backward, until it gets lost in the Early Middle Ages. Because it is from here, before the year 1000, that its history begins, as the first traces, even if vague, of its existence are found in this period.

==== World War 1 memorial ====
The Calosso World War 1 memorial commemorates the soldiers that came from Calosso that have fallen during the First World War

== Local government ==
Panoramic point in Creavacuore road, Calosso (ASTI), Italy

The comune belongs to the Comunità delle colline tra Langa e Monferrato.

== Viticulture ==
Around two-thirds of the area of the comune, and by far the greatest part of its agricultural land is devoted to vineyards. Production is on a small scale: this 10 square kilometres (4 mi^{2}) or so is divided between 380 farms and the total annual production of wine is around 4,900,000 litres (1,300,000 US gal).

The principal grape variety grown here is the Moscato Bianco, while others include Barbera, Dolcetto, Nebbiolo, Chardonnay and Freisa. Of particular interest is the cultivation of the now rare historical variety Gamba di Pernice (literally ‘Pheasant's leg’).

=== Economy ===
The agricultural companies in the town are very numerous and flourishing. The most widely practiced cultivation is vines and fruit trees. There are numerous DOC wines, among which we can remember Moscato d'Asti and Barbera d'Asti Superiore.

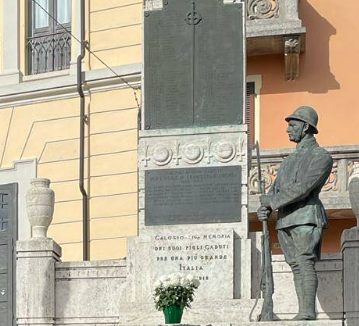

== Society ==
=== Demographic evolution ===
Historical population

Year	Pop.	±%
1861	2,414	—
1871	2,656	+10.0%
1881	2,684	+1.1%
1901	3,384	+26.1%
1911	3,319	−1.9%

Year	Pop.	±%
1921	3,282	−1.1%
1931	2,984	−9.1%
1936	2,821	−5.5%
1951	2,412	−14.5%
1961	2,202	−8.7%

Year	Pop.	±%
1971	1,846	−16.2%
1981	1,535	−16.8%
1991	1,356	−11.7%
2001	1,264	−6.8%

Source: Data from ISTAT

=== Foreign minorities ===
Foreign residents in Calosso as of 1 January 2025 were 110 and represent 9.6% of the resident population.

The largest foreign community is that from North Macedonia with 53 residents which represents 48.2% of all foreigners present in the territory, followed by Bulgaria with a total of 19 residents(17.3%).

=== Religion ===
The main religion in Calosso is Catholic Christianity

==== The parish ====
There is little documentation information on the parish of San Martino. Named after San Martino, bishop and confessor, it was built in the last decades of the 1600s, the church has a façade full of friezes in its central, high and slender part, composed of two superimposed bodies divided with pilasters and ending with a tympanum. Towards the end of the 19th century the Baroque construction was profoundly remodelled: in 1896, in fact, the building was enlarged on the sides, to the detriment of the side chapels. It was clear that the eighteenth-century frescoes attributed to De Canis and to the youthful period of Giovanni Carlo Alberti from Canelli, who lived between 1670 and 1727, were then destroyed. Between 1929 and 1930, the decorations of the vault were created at will of Monsignor Bosio. On the side of the sail stands the 42-meter bell tower.
