= Canelli =

- Comune
- Città di Canelli
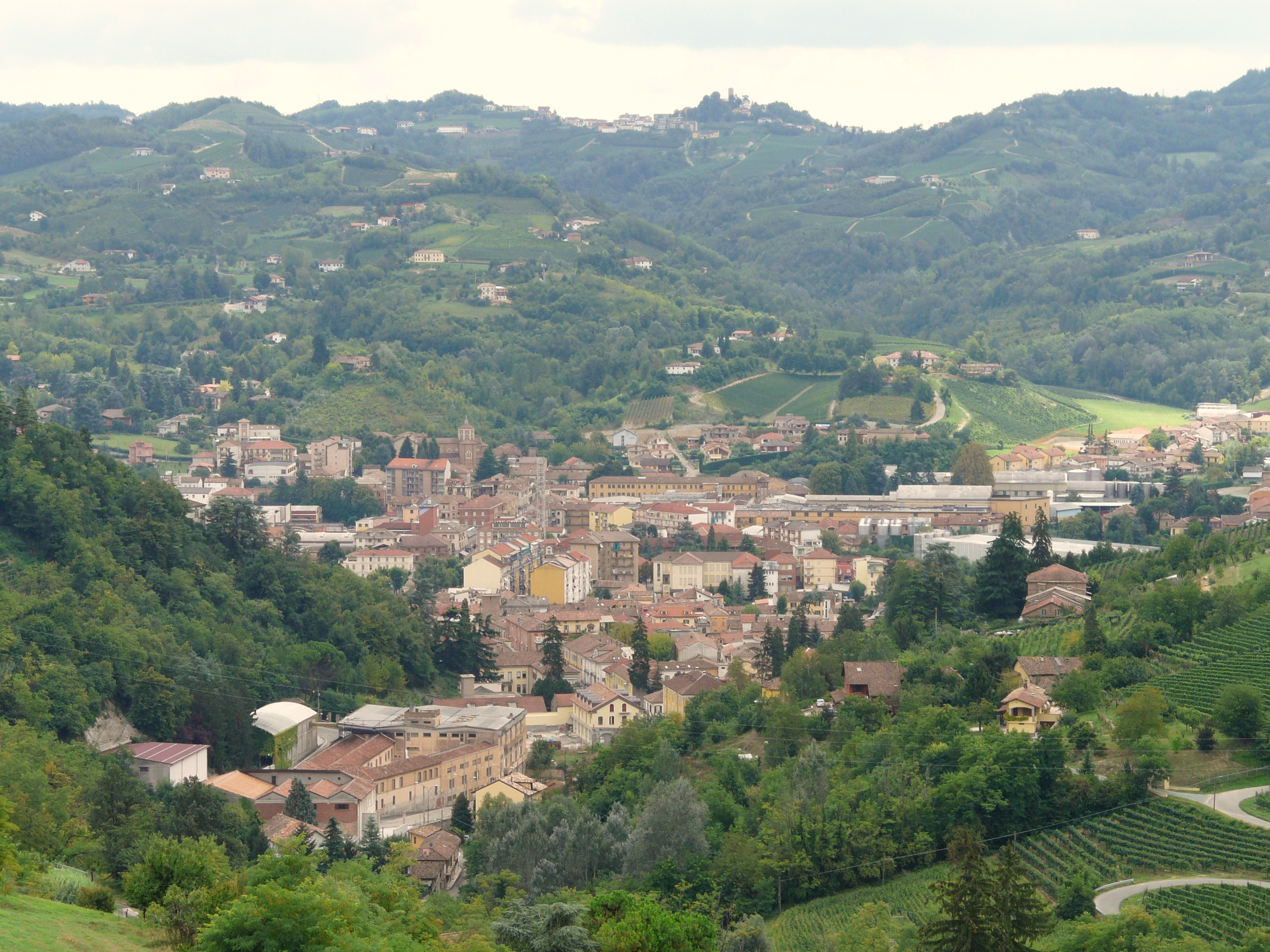
- View of Canelli

- Coat of arms

- Location of Canelli in Italy Canelli (Piedmont)
- Coordinates: 44°43′21″N 8°17′37″E
- Country: Italy
- Region: Piedmont
- Province: Province of Asti (AT)

Government
  - Mayor: Paolo Lanzavecchia (Lega)

Area
  - Total: 23.58 km^{2} (9.10 sq mi)
- Elevation: 157 m (515 ft)

Population (31 January 2024)
  - Total: 10,010
  - Density: 424.5/km^{2} (1,099/sq mi)
- Demonym: Canellesi
- Time zone: UTC+1 (CET)
  - Summer (DST): UTC+2 (CEST)
- Postal code: 14053
- Dialing code: 0141
- ISTAT code: 005017
- Patron saint: Thomas the Apostle
- Saint day: 21 December
- Website: Official website

UNESCO World Heritage Site
- Part of: Vineyard Landscape of Piedmont: Langhe-Roero and Monferrato
- Criteria: Cultural: (iii)(v)
- Reference: 1390rev-005
- Inscription: 2014 (38th Session)

Canelli (Piedmontese: Canèj) is a comune (municipality) in the Province of Asti in the Italian region of Piedmont. As of 31 January 2024 it has a population of 10,022

Canelli is located on a bend of the river Belbo in the Alto Monferrato (High Monferrat), close to the border with the Langhe. The area around the town is rich in vineyards. The area is believed to be the birthplace of the Italian sparkling wine Asti. The village's history of the wine is still evident today with the popular synonym of Muscat Canelli that is still used for the Moscato grape used to produce the wine.

The neighbouring comuni are Bubbio, Calamandrana, Calosso, Cassinasco, Loazzolo, Moasca and San Marzano Oliveto in the province of Asti, and Santo Stefano Belbo in the province of Cuneo.

On 22 June 2014, Canelli along with Asti Spumante was declared a UNESCO World Heritage Site.

== History ==
The territory of Canelli was already occupied in prehistoric times by settlers from Liguria. In Roman times it became a center of some importance, surrounded by numerous farms on which vines were cultivated.

After the Roman era Canelli fell into a long decline, but was already being called a città (town) by the year 961. By the middle of the 12th century, the descendants of the Counts of Acqui Terme had taken control.

In 1235 Canelli became an equal partner in the Republic of Asti and Canelli. It became an outpost in the republic's frequent wars against its great rival, the Duchy of Monferrato.

In 1613 Canelli broke the siege laid by Carlo I, later the Duke of Mantua, as part of a war of succession with the Duchy of Monferrato. The town's defenses were manned by soldiers from the Duchy of Savoy, actively supported by the citizens: Carlo's troops were unable to break through them. This heroic action is celebrated in a re-enactment that takes place every year in the third weekend in June - the Assedio di Canelli (Siege of Canelli).

On the night of 5 November 1994 the town was badly hit by a violent flood of the river Belbo that affected a large part of the town, devastating the local economy and causing some casualties.

Canelli was the start and finish of stage 6 of the 2023 Giro Donne won by Annemiek van Vleuten.

== Main sights ==
Canelli Castle was built in the 11th century to defend the roads leading to the ports of Savona and Vado Ligure. The castle was destroyed in 1617 during the war against Monferrato. Rebuilt and renovated in 1930 by Arturo Midana as an elegant villa, it is currently owned by the Gancia family.

Some sparkling white wines in Canelli are stored in its underground cellars. In these 'underground cathedrals', which are feats of engineering, millions of bottles are left to ferment at a constant temperature between 12 and 14 °C (54 and 57 °F). Extending 13 kilometres (8 mi) under the town, the cellars of Canelli are a candidate for UNESCO World Heritage Site status.

== Economy ==
The economy of Canelli is based on the production of sparkling wine, and of everything associated with it. The town is undoubtedly one of the wine capitals of the world, being home to such historic wineries as Gancia, Bosca, Contratto, Coppo and many others.

The main varieties cultivated in the municipality are:

- Moscato
- Barbera
- Dolcetto
- Cortese
- Chardonnay

The main wines produced are:

- Asti
- Moscato d'Asti
- Barbera d'Asti
- Dolcetto d'Asti
- Cortese dell'Alto Monferrato
- Freisa d'Asti

The significant number of wineries has also given rise to many companies that produce wine-making equipment.

The flood of 1994 was a disaster for the local economy: the mud and water that rushed into the cellars caused millions of Euros of fermenting wine to be lost. The economic diversification into wine-making equipment softened the blow.

== Festivals and events ==
- Assedio di Canelli (Siege of Canelli); 3rd weekend in June. Youtube video
- Citta del Vino (City of Wine Festival); 4th weekend in September.
- Fiera di San Martino (St. Martin's Fair); 2nd Sunday in November.
- Fiera Regionale del Tartufo (Regional Truffle Fair); 2nd Sunday in November.
- Canelli is one of the comuni (municipalities) that participates in the Palio di Asti. In 1974 it triumphed with the rider Mauro Finotto (nicknamed Jora) on the horse Anin / Spumantino.

Canelli has two market days every week, on Tuesday and Friday.

== People ==
- Giovanni Carlo Aliberti (1670–1727), painter
- Emanuele Olivieri (born 2008), racing driver

== Twinned towns ==
Canelli is twinned with:

- Menfi, Italy
- Piazza Armerina, Italy
- Mezőtúr, Hungary
- Ganzhou, China
