= Republic of Alto Monferrato =

Republic of Alto Monferrato Repubblica dell'Alto Monferrato
- 1944
- Flag
- Status: Unrecognized state
- Capital: Nizza Monferrato
- Common languages: Italian, Piedmontese
- Government: Italian partisan republic
- Historical era: World War II
  - Established: September 1944
  - Captured during Operation Koblenz-Süd: December 2, 1944
Preceded by	Succeeded by
Italian Social Republic	Italian Social Republic

The Republic of Alto Monferrato was a short lived partisan state existing from September to December 2, 1944. The state came to exist following the political union of two Italian resistance movements based in Nizza Monferrato and Costigliole d'Asti of the southern Montferrat region. Its main territory comprised the towns of Moasca, San Marzano Oliveto, Calamandrana, Mombercelli, Bruno, Bergamasco, and Castelnuovo Belbo. There were four subdivisions of Alto Monferrato's troops; the VIII and IX division led by the Garibaldi Brigades, and the II and V division led autonomously.

== Operation Koblenz-Süd ==
The republic was left to a swift and violent end in 1944 during the Operation Koblenz-Süd, a roundup led by Nazi German troops and supported by Fascist Italy. When the enemy troops arrived, the resistance troops (often new recruits with limited military experience) fled into the mountains. The Nazis quickly occupied Nizza Monferrato in December 2, de facto beheading the republic and rounding civilians suspected of supporting partisan forces. The operation ended only three weeks after, in December 21, with around 400 partisans captured and shot. Surviving prisoners, one including a member of the Alto Monferrato council, were sent to Nazi concentration camps. Captured civilians, nearing one thousands, were also sent to forced labor in Germany.
