= Costigliole d'Asti =

Costigliole d'Asti Costiòle d'Ast (Piedmontese)
- Comune
- Comune di Costigliole d'Asti
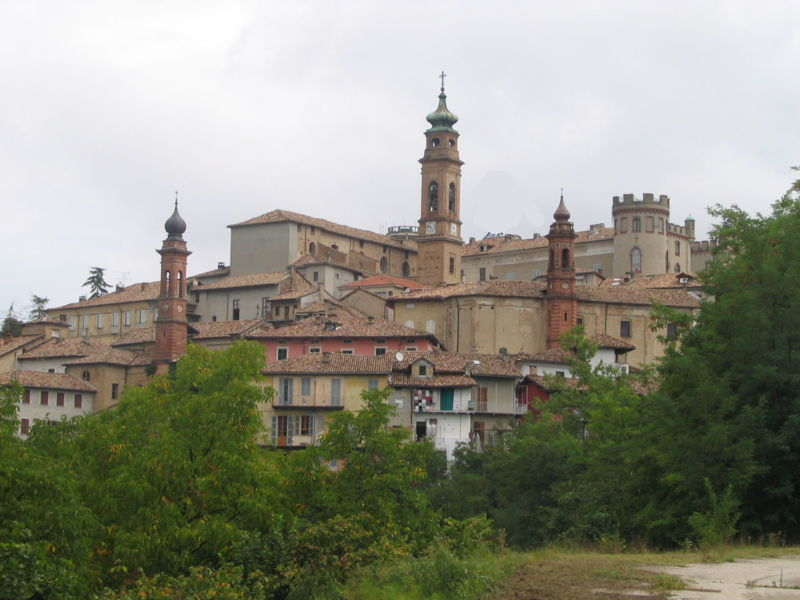
- View of Costigliole d'Asti

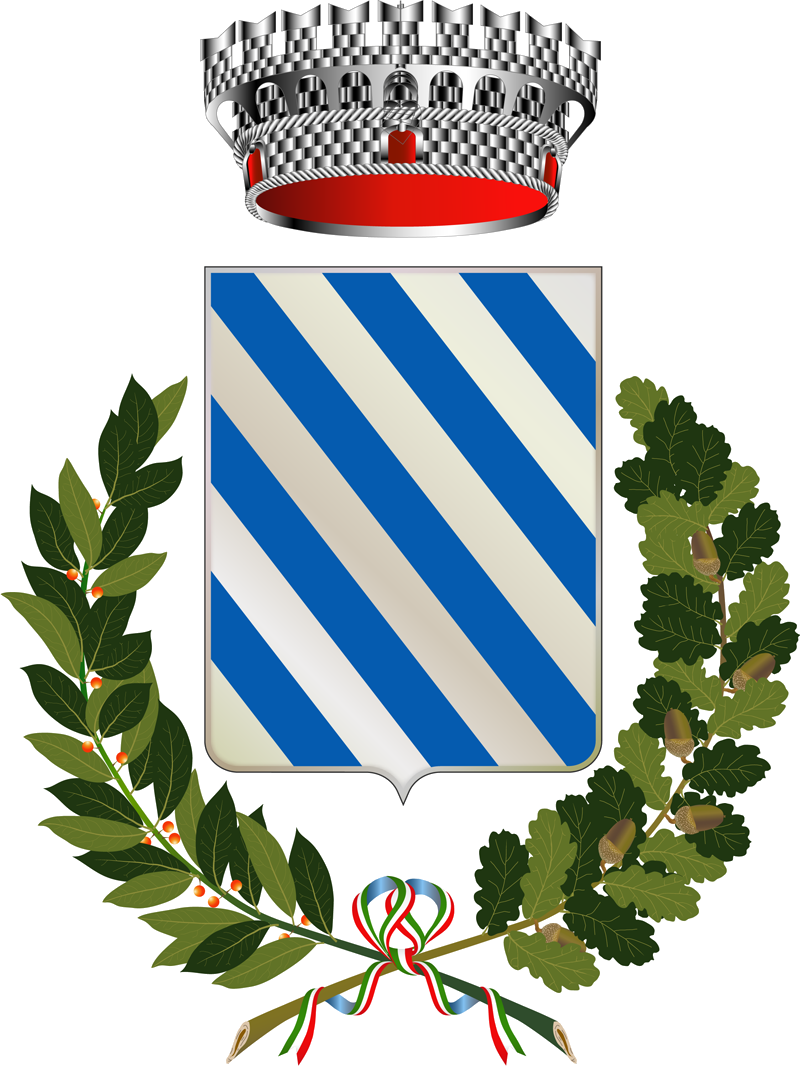
- Coat of arms

- Location within Italy Location within Piedmont
- Coordinates: 44°47′6″N 8°10′55″E
- Country: Italy
- Region: Piedmont
- Province: Asti (AT)
- Frazioni: Annunziata, Bionzo, Boglietto, Burio, Case Marchisio, Loreto, Motta, Sabbionassi, Santa Margherita, Sant'Anna

Government
  - Mayor: Enrico Cavallero

Area
  - Total: 36.86 km^{2} (14.23 sq mi)
- Elevation: 242 m (794 ft)

Population (31 May 2007)
  - Total: 5,981
  - Density: 162.3/km^{2} (420.3/sq mi)
- Demonym: Costigliolesi
- Time zone: UTC+1 (CET)
  - Summer (DST): UTC+2 (CEST)
- Postal code: 14055
- Dialing code: 0141
- Patron saint: Our Lady of Loreto
- Saint day: 10 December
- Website: Official website

Costigliole d'Asti (Piedmontese: Costiòle d'Ast) is a small Italian town in the Province of Asti, southern Piedmont. It lies about 13 kilometres (8 miles) south of the city of Asti in the Alto Monferrato, on the edge of the Langhe, in the alluvial plain of the river Tanaro southwards into the hills. The name derives from the Latin Corte Costeliolae.

The neighbouring communes are Agliano Terme, Antignano, Calosso, Castagnole delle Lanze, Isola d'Asti, Montegrosso d'Asti, and San Martino Alfieri (in the Province of Asti); and Castiglione Tinella and Govone (in the Province of Cuneo).

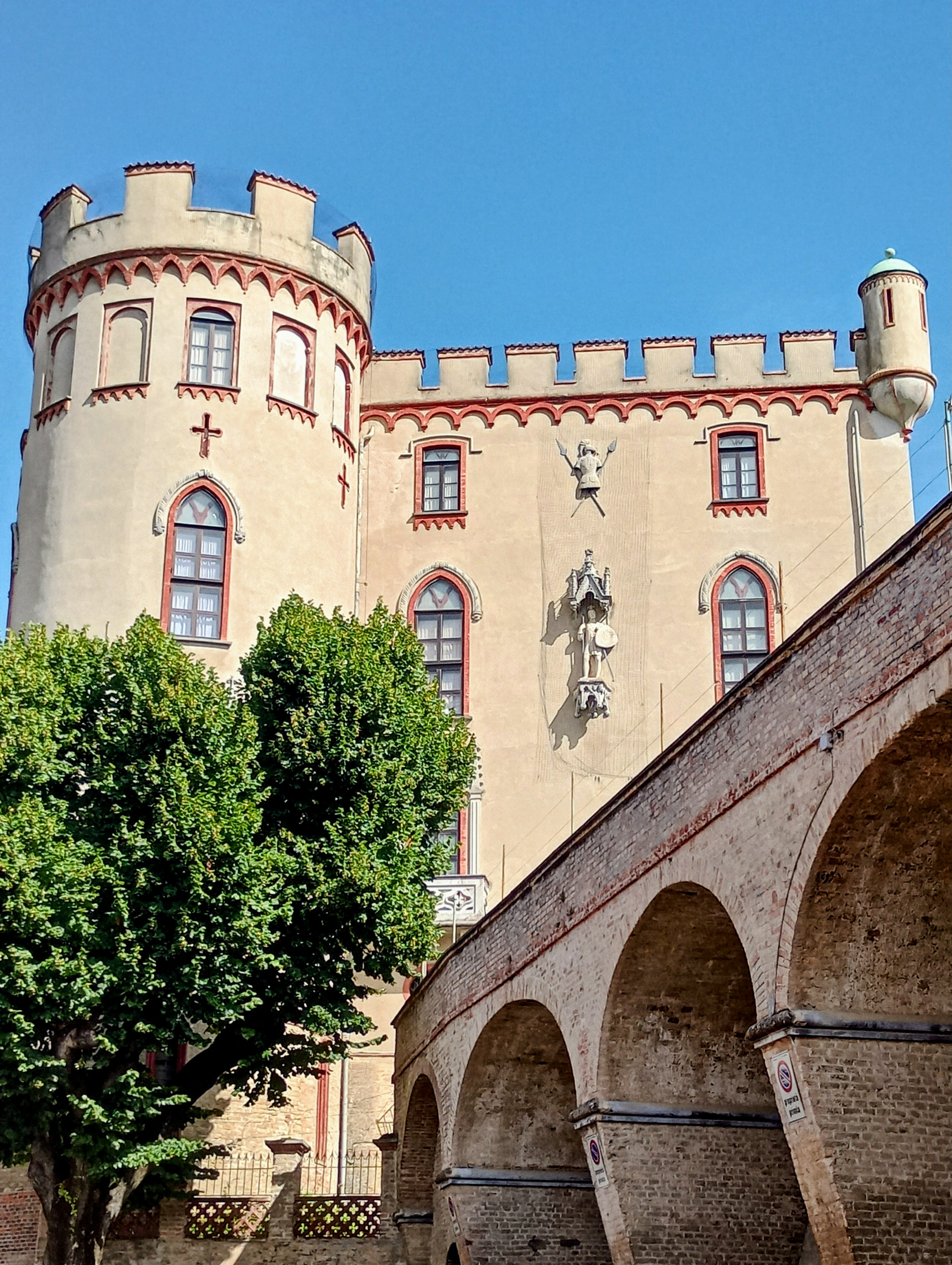
a section of the 11th century Costigliole d'Asti castle

== Costigliole d'Asti castle ==
The imposing, well-preserved medieval Gothic style castle dating from the 11th century is the town's defining feature. In the conflict between the Guelphs and Ghibellines the castle was much contested between the two factions. The Counts of Verasis Asinara inherited the castle in the 17th century. It was the home of the notorious Virginia Oldoini, wife of Francesco Verasis, Count of Castiglione; the castle having been part of his inheritance. It has been renovated a number of times over the centuries.

== Wine ==
Costigliole d'Asti is particularly known for its viticulture. Its vineyards, which cover an area of more than 11.75 square kilometres (4.54 sq mi), are the most extensive of any Piedmontese commune.

=== Red wines ===
The main grape varieties grown are Barbera, Dolcetto, Grignolino, Freisa and Brachetto. The Denominazione di Origine Controllata (DOC) wines produced from these are:

- Barbera d'Asti
- Barbera del Monferrato
- Piemonte Barbera
- Monferrato Dolcetto
- Freisa d'Asti
- Grignolino d'Asti
- Piemonte Brachetto

=== White wines ===
The Moscato Bianco grape is grown for the production of three Denominazione di Origine Controllata e Garantita (DOCG) or DOC wines:

- Moscato d'Asti DOCG
- Asti DOCG
- Piemonte Moscato passito DOC

The Cortese and Chardonnay varieties are used for two DOC wines:

- Piemonte Cortese
- Piemonte Chardonnay

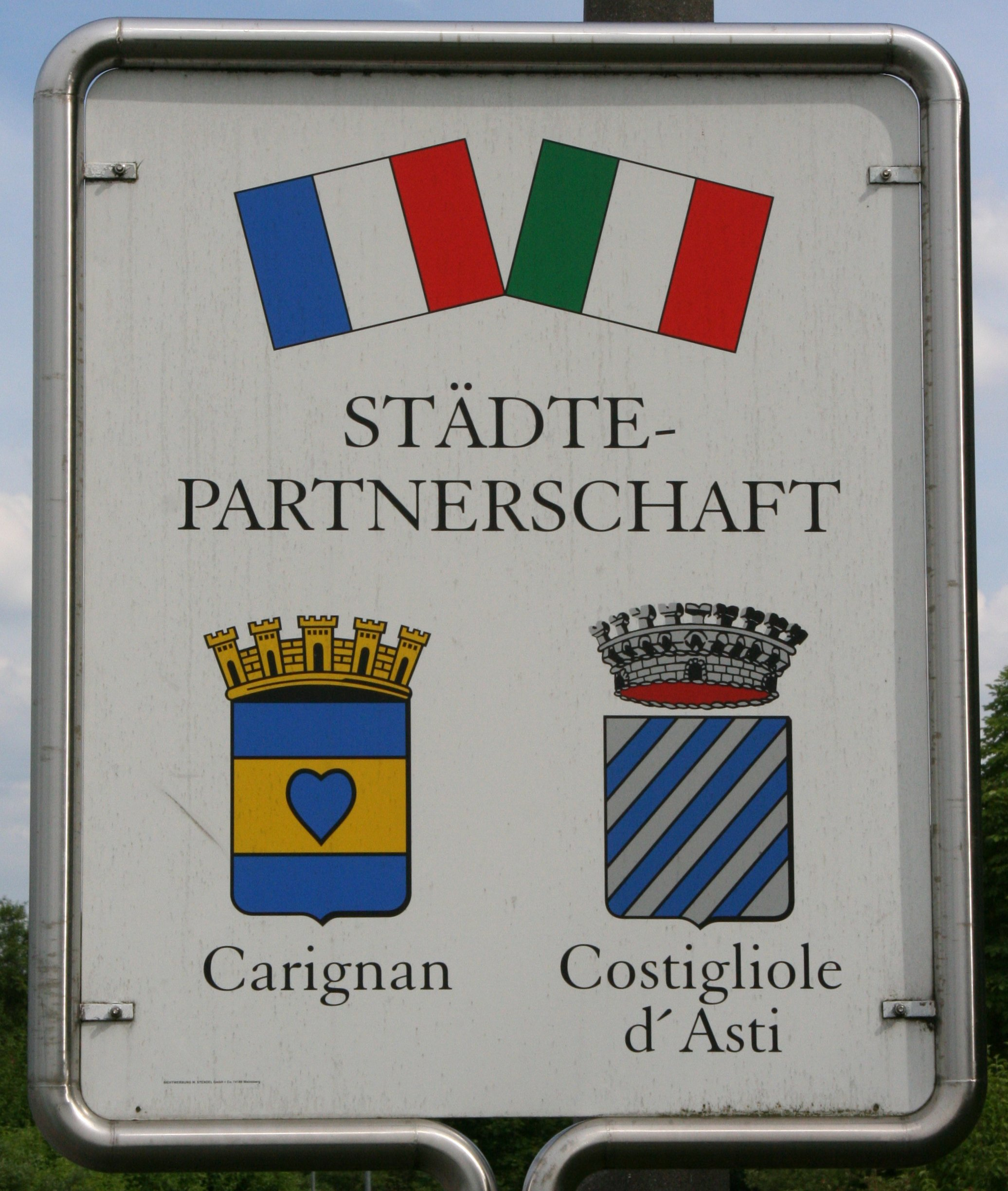
Coats of arms of Weinsbergs twin towns Carignan (France) and Costigliole d'Asti (Italy)

== International relations ==
=== Twin towns – Sister cities ===
- Weinsberg, Germany; twinned since 2000
