= San Marzano Oliveto =

- Comune
- Comune di San Marzano Oliveto
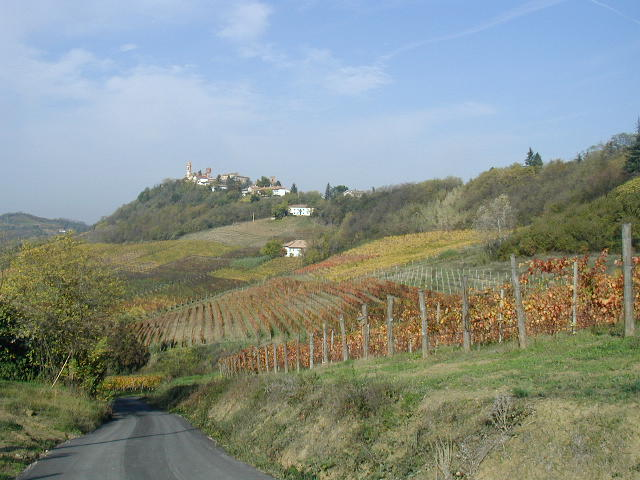

- Coat of arms

- Location within Italy Location within Piedmont
- Coordinates: 44°45′16″N 8°17′44″E
- Country: Italy
- Region: Piedmont
- Province: Asti (AT)
- Frazioni: Corte, Italiana, Leiso, Saline

Government
  - Mayor: Giovanni Gabri

Area
  - Total: 9.7 km^{2} (3.7 sq mi)
- Elevation: 300 m (980 ft)

Population (31 December 2010)
  - Total: 1,075
  - Density: 110/km^{2} (290/sq mi)
- Demonym: Sanmarzanesi
- Time zone: UTC+1 (CET)
  - Summer (DST): UTC+2 (CEST)
- Postal code: 14050
- Dialing code: 0141
- Patron saint: Saint Mary Magdalene
- Saint day: July 22
- Website: Official website

San Marzano Oliveto is a comune (municipality) in the Province of Asti in the Italian region Piedmont, located about 60 kilometres (37 mi) southeast of Turin and about 20 kilometres (12 mi) southeast of Asti.

San Marzano Oliveto is located in a panoramic position 300 metres (980 ft) above sea level. It is easily visible from the SS6 road that runs from Canelli to Asti.

== History ==
=== Origins ===
San Marzano was named after St. Marcian of Tortona, the first Bishop of Tortona (or perhaps a bishop of Ravenna), who was martyred in the 2nd century by the Roman emperor Hadrian.

The suffix "Oliveto" was added in 1862 because olives were said to have prospered there in ancient times. This hypothesis is supported by the existence of an ancient olive press in nearby Santo Stefano Belbo, and by the fact that olives continue to thrive there, although not in any great quantity, to the present day.

The first human settlers to the area came from Liguria, but the first extant buildings and documentary evidence of settlement date from Roman times.

Tradition has it that the four towers, now collapsed, of the present castle were built by the Romans.

=== The Middle Ages ===
The history of San Marzano, like that of Moasca, Calamandrana, Rocchetta Tanaro and Calosso, is linked to the history of Canelli.

All were involved in the struggle between Asti, Alessandria and the Marquisate of Montferrat.

From the mid-14th century San Marzano Oliveto was a fief of the Asinari, who also owned Costigliole d'Asti, Moasca and other villages.

In 1280 Bonifacio Asinari, a rich merchant from Asti, left his wealth to his children, Bonifacio and Tommaso, who subsequently became the owners of San Marzano.

=== Modern era ===
In 1771, Philip Valentino Asinari became the first Marquis of San Marzano and Caraglio; his son Filippo Maria Antonio became a State Councilor, sent by Napoleon Bonaparte as ambassador to Berlin. In 1808 he became a Count of the Empire, and then in 1813 a senator and regent of Piedmont.

During the Second World War, partisan resistance began earlier in San Marzano Oliveto than in other comuni in the region.

On 24 and 25 December 1943, arriving first from Nizza Monferrato and later from Asti, soldiers of the Italian Socialist Republic combed the area, searching every house for partisans, as the town was part of the partisan Republic of Alto Monferrato. No partisans were found, but four hostages were taken and sent to Asti.

== Heraldry ==
The old emblem of the municipality is formed by a crenellated tower, topped by a crown (gold on blue) with the motto "Virtus addidit". It incorporates the coat of arms of the Asinari family, lords of San Marzano between the thirteenth and seventeenth centuries.

== Main sights ==
Cited by Alfieri as "San Marzano of Acquosana", the first documents that mention the castle date from the birth of the Contado of Acquosana - the ancient territory of Acqui Terme.

The castle, probably of Roman origin, has a square tower that was added by the Asinari family. The tower has four square crenellations, one in each corner: the embrasures of one of them can still be seen today.

After the Spanish occupation of 1655, the castle returned to Asinari control. It was subsequently transformed into a country residence.

The town hall dates from 1889. It is a multipurpose building that houses local government offices, a primary school, and the post office.

The Parish Church of San Marziano was built in classic Renaissance style with a neoclassical nave, presbytery and choir. Located in front of the castle, it was founded in the thirteenth century, enlarged from 1758 to 1763, and restored in 1843.

== Economy ==
The economy of San Marzano Oliveto is based on agriculture.

The arable land constitutes 75% of the total area; about 300 people are engaged in agricultural work. 220 hectares are dedicated to fruit production - particularly apples and grapes, for which the mild climate, the topology and the soil composition are especially favourable.

After a period of crisis due to competition from the north eastern regions of Italy, apple production has recovered well. The annual production of apples is about 40 thousand quintals, 80% of which are of the Golden Delicious variety.

A few years ago, a group of San Marzano producers formed a consortium to promote apples with the "Divina" brand.

San Marzano is also in the following wine-producing zones:

- Moscato d'Asti DOC
- Nizza DOCG
- Barbera d'Asti DOCG
- Cortese dell'Alto Monferrato DOC
- Freisa d'Asti DOC

The quality of the Barbera produced in the region is particularly noteworthy.

== Tourism ==
San Marzano Oliveto plays a significant role in the promotion of wine tourism in the Piedmont region. Tourists are attracted to the many wineries and vineyards in the region, many of which offer tasting facilities for visitors, and to the many restaurants that offer rare local vintages in addition to the highly renowned Piedmontese cuisine.
