= Agliano Terme =

Agliano Terme Ajan
- Comune
- Comune di Agliano Terme
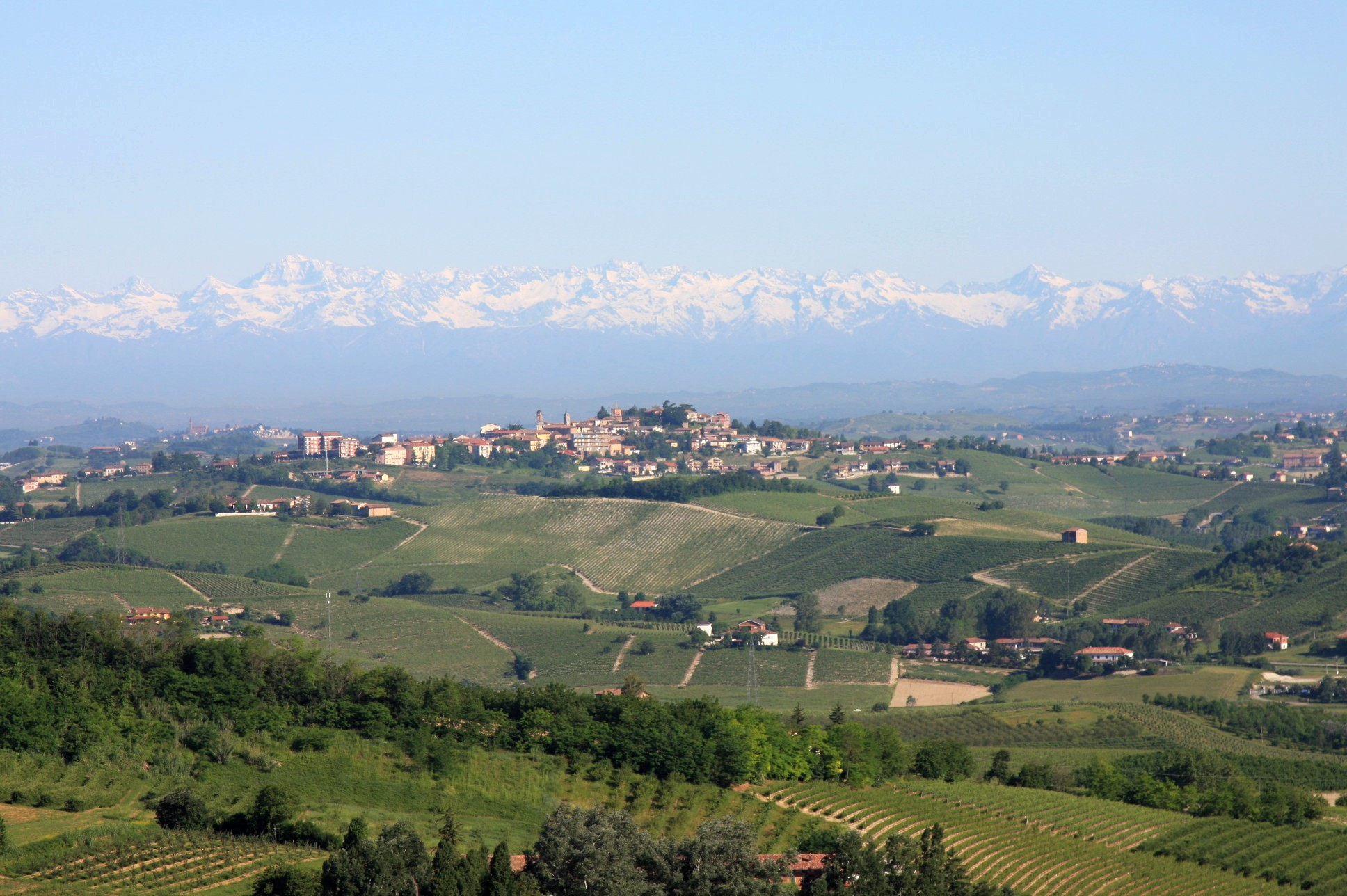
- View of Agliano Terme

- Coat of arms

- Location of Agliano Terme in Italy Agliano Terme (Piedmont)
- Coordinates: 44°48′N 8°15′E
- Country: Italy
- Region: Piedmont
- Province: Asti (AT)

Government
  - Mayor: Marco Biglia (Alternativa per Agliano)

Area
  - Total: 15.45 km^{2} (5.97 sq mi)
- Elevation: 263 m (863 ft)

Population (30 April 2017)
  - Total: 1,633
  - Density: 105.7/km^{2} (273.8/sq mi)
- Demonym: Aglianesi
- Time zone: UTC+1 (CET)
  - Summer (DST): UTC+2 (CEST)
- Postal code: 14041
- Dialing code: 0141
- Website: Official website

Agliano Terme (Piedmontese: Ajan) is a comune (municipality) in the Province of Asti in the Italian region Piedmont, located about 50 kilometres (31 mi) southeast of Turin and about 12 kilometres (7 mi) southeast of Asti.

Agliano Terme borders the following municipalities: Calosso, Castelnuovo Calcea, Costigliole d'Asti, Moasca, and Montegrosso d'Asti. Traditionally called simply Agliano (or Ajan in Piemontese), the "Terme" was added in recent times to draw attention to the presence of thermal baths, a tourist attraction.
