= Muscat Rouge à Petits Grains =

Variety of grape

- Grape (Vitis)
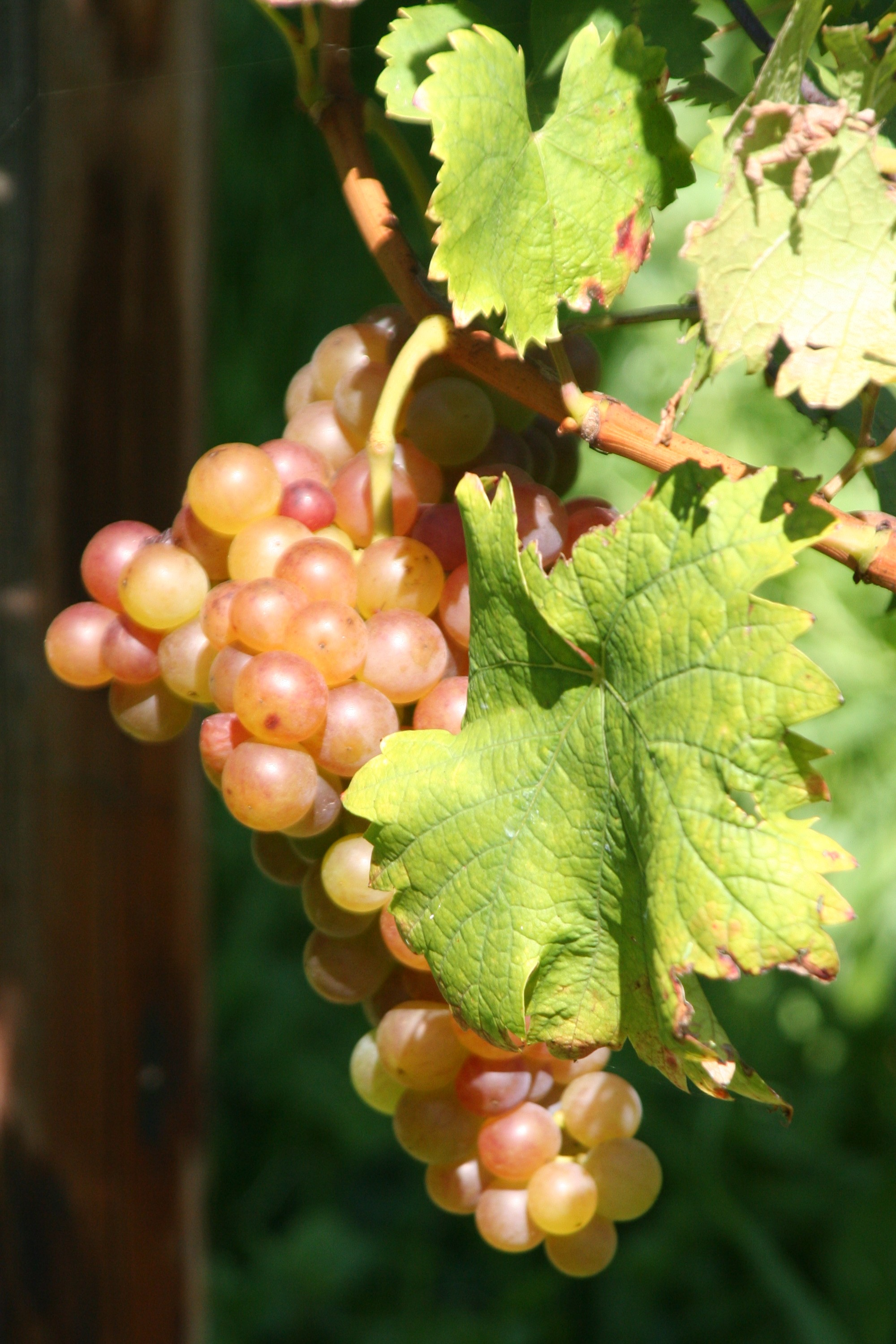
- Roter Muskateller in Weinsberg
- Color of berry skin: Rouge
- Species: Vitis vinifera
- Also called: see list
- Origin: Greece
- VIVC number: 8248

Muscat Rouge à Petits Grains (French pronunciation: [myska ʁuʒ a pəti ɡʁɛ̃]) is a wine grape for white wine that is a member of the Muscat family of Vitis vinifera. Its name comes from its characteristic small berry size and tight clusters, and from its skin colour. It's a variation of the more common Muscat Blanc à Petits Grains with a reddish colour, which in some of its synonyms are described as brown, gray or violet. Muscat Rose à Petits Grains is a further variation with lighter, pinkish skin colour.

It originates from Greece.

== Synonyms ==
Muscat Rouge à Petits Grains is known under the following synonyms: Apiana Moschata, Brauner Muskateller, Brown Frontignac, Brown Muscat, Busuioacă, Busuioacă de Bohotin, Busuioacă di Bohotin, Busuioaca Roza, Busuioaca Vanata, Busuioaca Vanata di Bohotin, Cehrayi Muskat, Cervena Dincha, Cervena Dinka, Grauer Muskateller, Grauroter Muskateller, Grizeline, Grizly Frontinac, Grizzly Frontignan, Gros Muscat Violet, Kümmeltraube, Madère, Montepulciano, Moscadello Rosso, Moscado Rosso, Moscatel de Grano Menudo Rojo, Moscatel Galego Roxo, Moscatel Gordomorado, Moscatel Menudo, Moscatel Menudo Morado, Moscatel Rojo, Moscatel Roxo, Moscatella Rubra, Moscato Rosata, Moscato Rosso, Moscato Rosso de Madera, Moscato Violetto, Moscha Aromatica, Moscodel Menudo Morado, Muscat à Petits Grains Rouges, Muscat Brun, Muscat Corail, Muscat d'Alsace Rouge, Muscat de Corail, Muscat Frontignan Rouge, Muscat Frontignon, Muscat Frontinyanskiy, Muscat Gris, Muscat Piemont, Muscat Pink, Muscat Red, Muscat Rouge, Muscat Rouge de Frontignan, Muscat Violet, Muscat Violet Commun, Muscat Violet Cyperus, Muscat Rouge à Petits Grains Muscat Rouge de Frontignac, Muscat Rouge de Frontignan, Muscat Rouge de Madeira, Muscat Rozovy, Muscat Violet, Muscat Violet Commun, Muscat Violet Cyperus, Muscat Violet de Madère, Muscateller Rubbra, Muscateller Rot, Muscateller Violet, Muskat Frontinyanskii, Muskat Frontinyanskiy, Muskat Kalyaba, Muskat Krasnyi, Muskat Krasnyj, Muskat Rozovyi, Muskat Rozovyj, Muskat Violetovii, Muskateller Grau, Muskateller Rot, Muskateller Roter, Muskateller Schwarzblau, Muskateller Violett, Piros Muskotaly, Qirmizi Muskat, Red Constantia, Red Frontignac, Red Frontignan, Red Muscadel, Red Muscat, Red Muskadel, Roter Muskateller, Rothe Schmeckende, Rothe Schmeckete, Rother Frontignac, Rother Muscateller, Rother Spanischer Muskateller, Rother Weihrauch, Rother Weirauch, Rothmuscateller, Schmeckende, Schmeckende Roth, Schmeckete, Tafeltraube Fleischmann, Tamaiioasa de Bohotin, Tamaioasa di Bohotin, Tamaioasa Violeta, Uva Turca Rubra, Violetter Muskateller, Weihrauch Roth, Wohlschmeckende Bisamrebeh, Mavro Moschato.

Some synonyms are shared with other Muscat varieties.
