= Giovanni Antonio Laveglia =

Italian painter

Giovanni Antonio Laveglia/LaVeglia (1653 – after 1710) was an Italian painter of the seventeenth and eighteenth centuries, active in the Piedmont.

== Biography ==
He was born in Carmagnola to father painter, Pietro Laveglia, (1625-1675) who had emigrated to Asti from Paris. A canvas at the Civic Gallery of the Palazzo Mazzetti, depicting Christ and the Apostles on the shores of the Borbore (circa 1671) includes a distant view of the town of Asti.

In Bartoli's Notizia about artworks, he takes notice of a Laveglia d'Asti, who was a painter of quadratura in the church of San Martino of Astia.

In 1677, Giovanni Antonio married Lucrezia Maria Fariano in Asti. In 1708, Giovanni Carlo Aliberti married Giovanni Antonio's daughter.
