= Tinella =

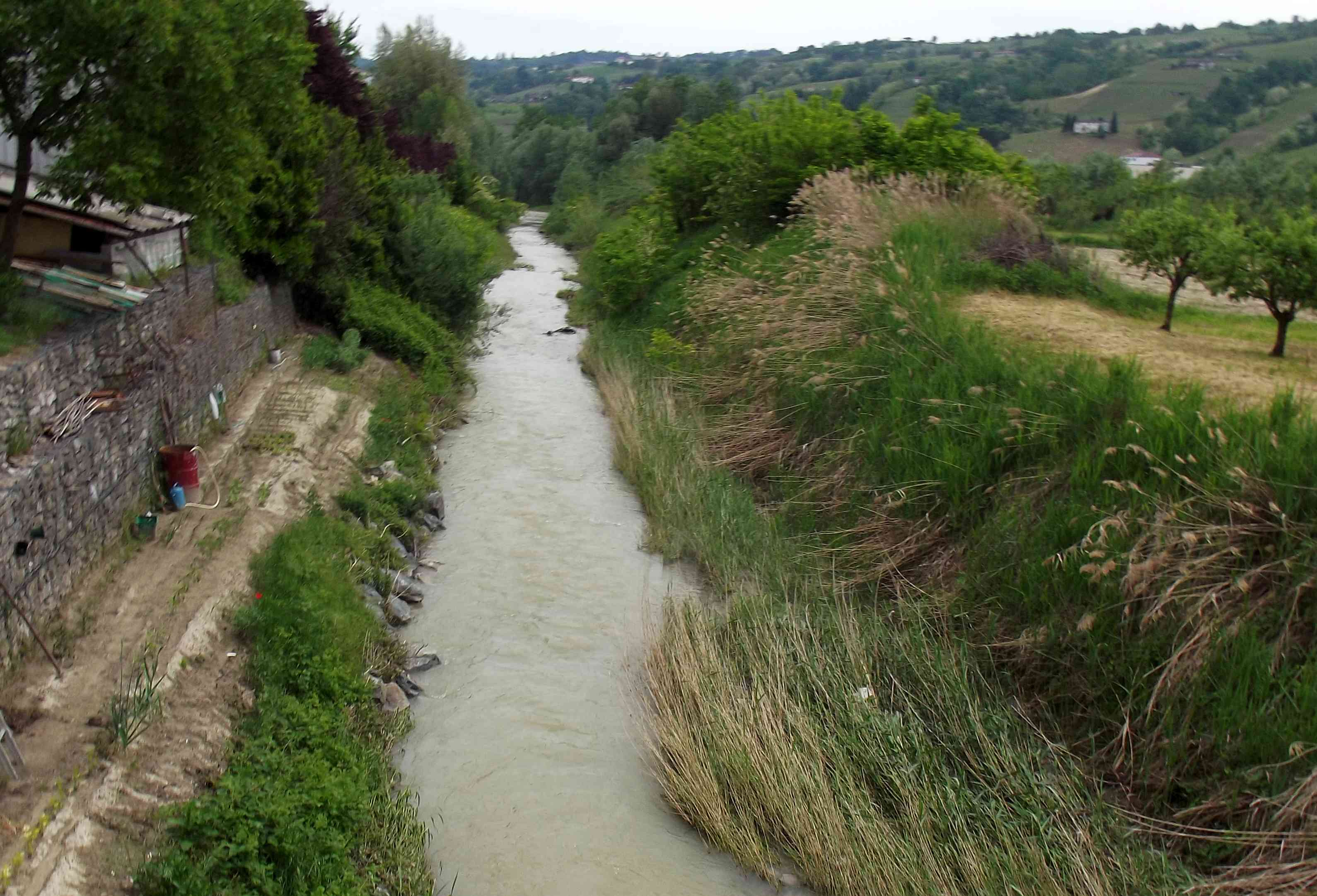
- The stream near Santo Stefano Belbo

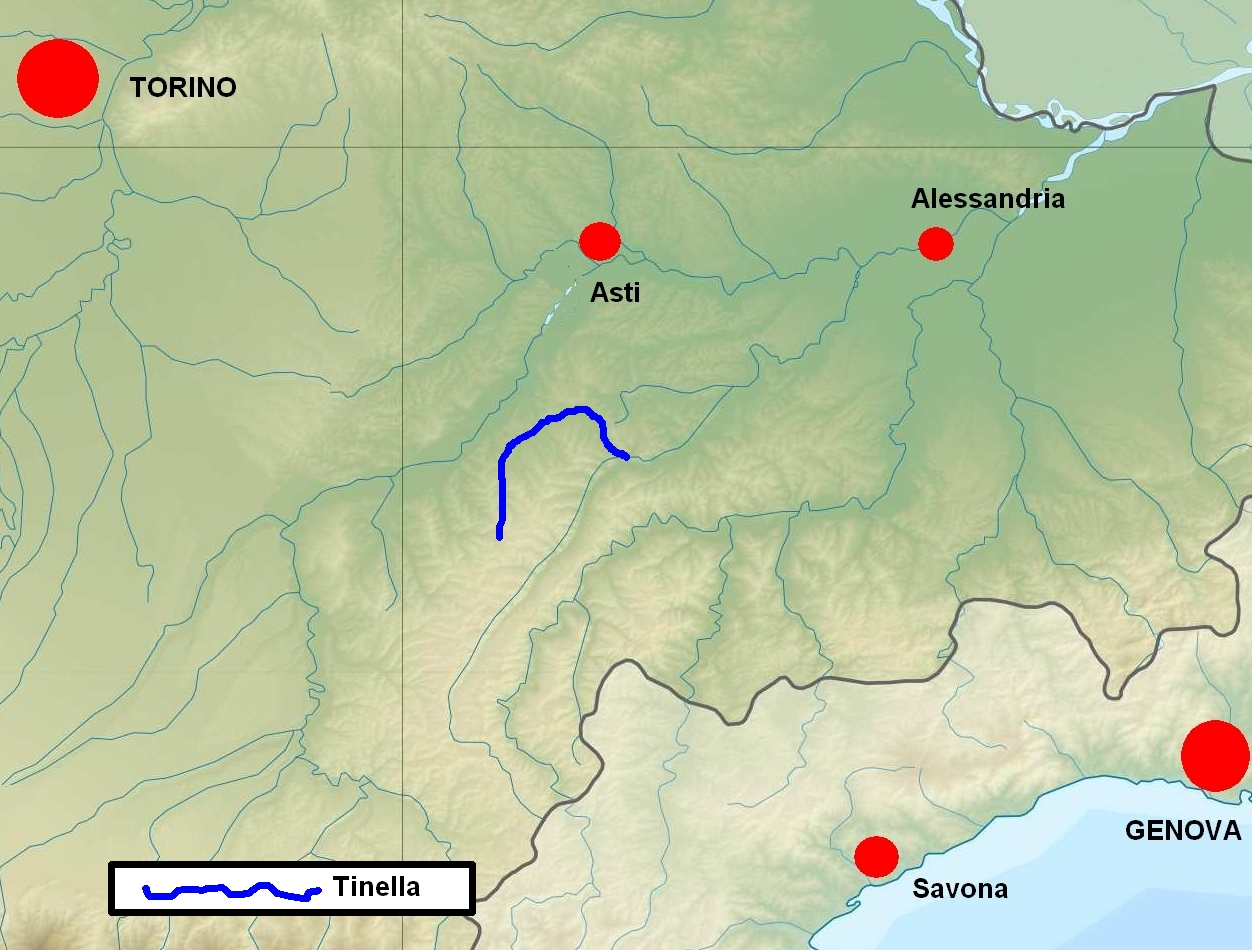
- Location of the stream within southern Piedmont

Location
- Country: Italy: Province of Cuneo

Physical characteristics
- Source
  - location: Langhe
- Mouth
  - location: Belbo near Santo Stefano Belbo
  - coordinates: 44°42′53″N 8°14′34″E
- Length: 23.1 km (14.4 mi)
- Basin size: 81.7 square kilometres (31.5 mi^{2})
- Discharge
  - average: (mouth) 1 m^{3}/s (35 cu ft/s)

Basin features
- Progression: Belbo→ Tanaro→ Po→ Adriatic Sea

The Tinella, the principal tributary of the Belbo, is a minor stream of Piedmont in northwestern Italy whose course falls entirely within the Province of Cuneo.

== Geography ==
Its sources are a number of springs in the hills near Trezzo Tinella. For 23 kilometres (14 mi) it follows a narrow and confined course through the Langhe, making a broad arc to the south-east, then joins the Belbo above Santo Stefano Belbo.

== Regime ==
Its regime is typical of a small Apeninne torrent: its discharge—normally very modest—can turn to a violent flood in the event of heavy precipitation.

== Other projects ==
Media related to Tinella at Wikimedia Commons
