= Giovanni Carlo Aliberti =

Italian painter

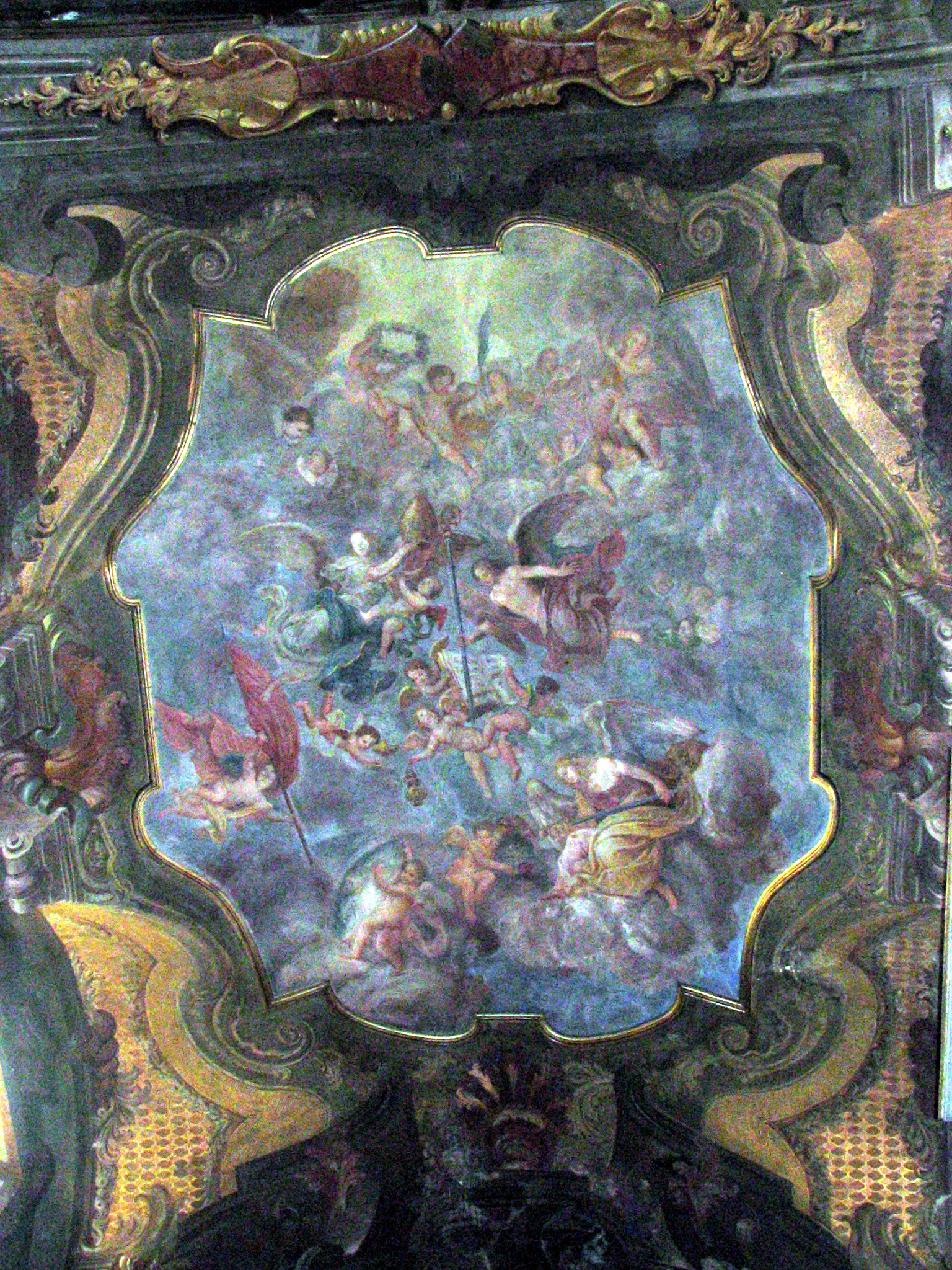
Fresco in S. Martino, Asti

Gian Carlo Aliberti, also Giancarlo or Giovanni Carlo Aliberti, (13 February 1670 - 2 February 1727) was a prolific Piedmontese painter of the seventeenth and eighteenth centuries.

== Biography ==
He was born in Canelli in 1670 (according to some sources on 5 March 1662). He soon moved to Asti. His artistic training is not known. According to Lanzi, he made his own manner of painting, that is, he resented the Maratta and the Carracci school, with some echoes from Correggio. His activity, very fervent, however, took place within his region. He likely trained with Giovanni Battista Fariano in Asti. By the turn of the century, he moved to Rome to pursue further training. Returning to Asti, he wed the daughter of the painter Giovanni Antonio Laveglia. In Canelli, there are two canvases, Death of St Joseph and an Immaculate Conception located in the parish church of San Tommaso. Other paintings in the city include a Pentecost, an Epiphany, a St Roch among the pestilent and a St George.

Many of his frescoes, painted in the Rococo manner, have been lost along with the churches for which they were made. Two from Sant’Anastasio, Asti (demolished in 1907) are conserved in the town's civic art gallery in Palazzo Mazzetti: Tobias and the Angel, and Healing of the Paralysed. The Gallery also exhibits St Anne between St Carlo Borromeo and Ste Cristina. The Miracle of Saint Clare is depicted at the church of Santa Chiara in Cuneo.

His works are also found in Santa Caterina, Casale Monferrato; San Martino, La Morra; and Sant'Agostino, Cherasco.

He died in Asti in 1727.

He had two sons: Carlo Filippo, born in Asti, who died after 1776, a civil architect and theatre designer, and Giuseppe Amedeo, known as Abate Aliberti, born in Asti around 1710, who died in 1772, a painter, also known by the name of Gian Giacomo.
