= Moasca =

- Comune
- Comune di Moasca
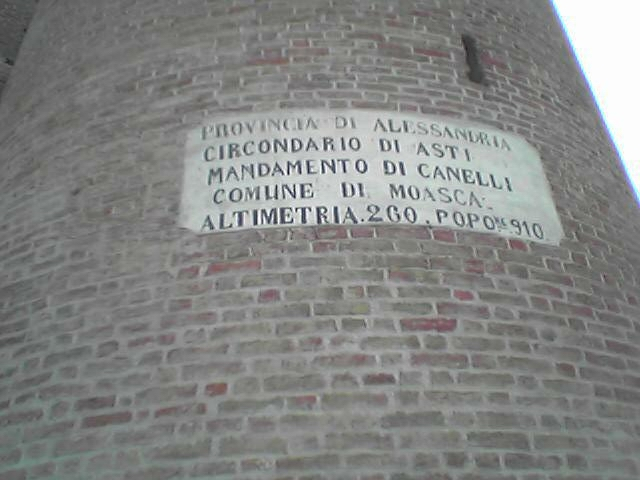

- Location within Italy Location within Piedmont
- Coordinates: 44°46′N 8°17′E
- Country: Italy
- Region: Piedmont
- Province: Asti (AT)

Government
  - Mayor: Andrea Ghignone

Area
  - Total: 4.16 km^{2} (1.61 sq mi)
- Elevation: 260 m (850 ft)

Population (31 january 2024)
  - Total: 509
  - Density: 122/km^{2} (317/sq mi)
- Demonym: Moaschesi
- Time zone: UTC+1 (CET)
  - Summer (DST): UTC+2 (CEST)
- Postal code: 14050
- Dialing code: 0141
- ISTAT code: 005063
- Patron saint: Saint Peter
- Saint day: 29th June
- Website: Official website

Moasca is a comune (municipality) in the Province of Asti in the Italian region Piedmont, located about 60 kilometres (37 mi) southeast of Turin and about 15 kilometres (9 mi) southeast of Asti. As of January 2024 it had a population of 509

Moasca borders the following municipalities: Agliano Terme, Calosso, Canelli, Castelnuovo Calcea, and San Marzano Oliveto.
