= Calamandrana =

- Comune
- Comune di Calamandrana
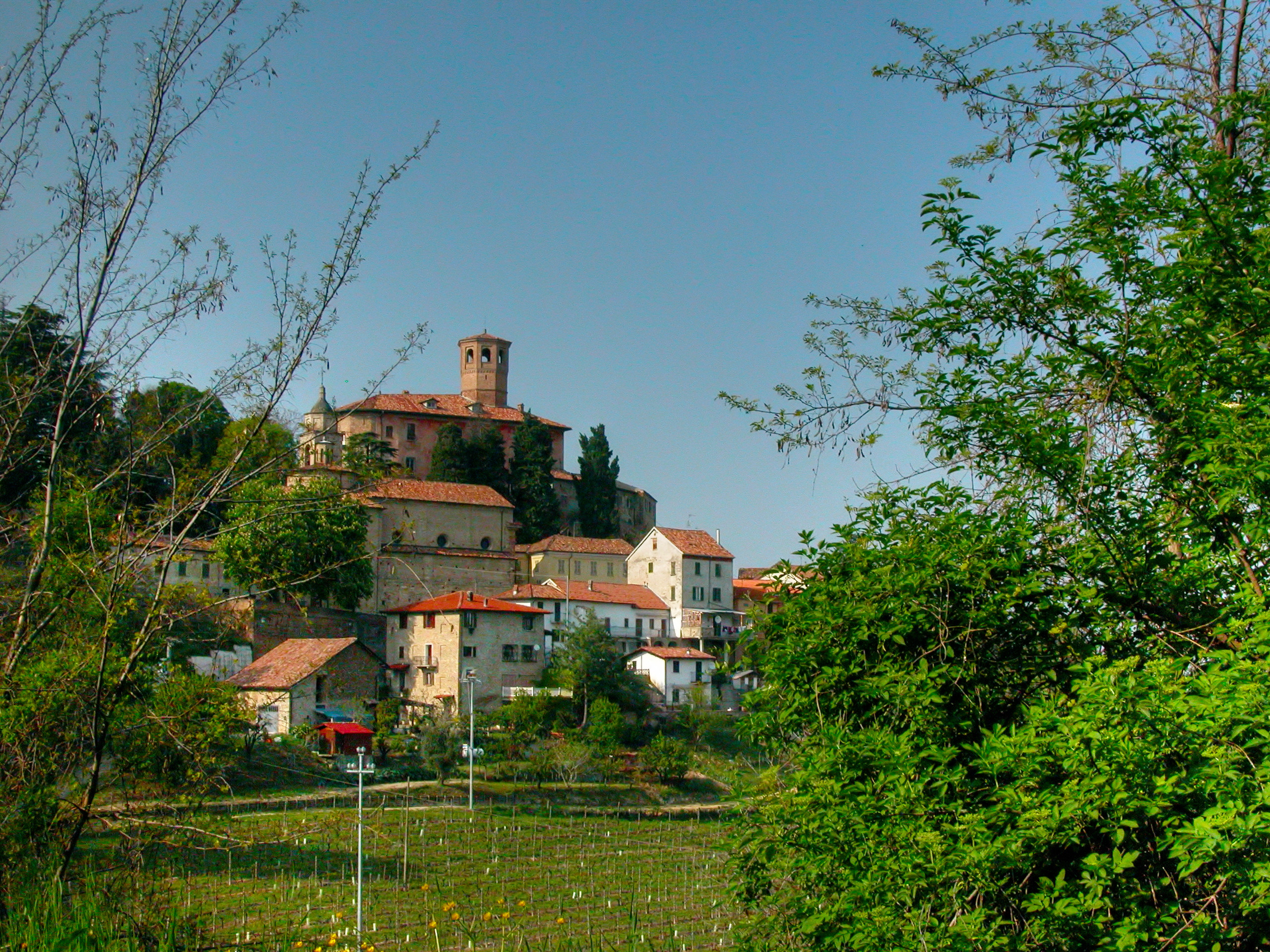
- View of Calamandrana

- Coat of arms

- Location within Italy Location within Piedmont
- Coordinates: 44°44′N 8°20′E
- Country: Italy
- Region: Piedmont
- Province: Asti (AT)
- Frazioni: Boidi, Bruciati, Case Vecchie, Chiesa Vecchia, Ferrai, Garbazzola, Quartino, San Vito, Valle Chiozze, Valle San Giovanni

Government
  - Mayor: Fabio Isnardi

Area
  - Total: 12.7 km^{2} (4.9 sq mi)
- Elevation: 151 m (495 ft)

Population (31 December 2010)
  - Total: 1,807
  - Density: 142/km^{2} (369/sq mi)
- Demonym: Calamandranesi
- Time zone: UTC+1 (CET)
  - Summer (DST): UTC+2 (CEST)
- Postal code: 14042
- Dialing code: 0141
- Website: Official website

Calamandrana is a comune (municipality) in the Province of Asti in the Italian region Piedmont, located about 60 kilometres (37 mi) southeast of Turin and about 20 kilometres (12 mi) southeast of Asti.

Calamandrana borders the following municipalities: Canelli, Cassinasco, Castel Boglione, Nizza Monferrato, Rocchetta Palafea, and San Marzano Oliveto.

== People ==
- Giulio Cesare Cordara (1704–1785), historian and writer.

== Twin towns ==
Calamandrana is twinned with:

- Kisapostag, Hungary
