= Belbo =

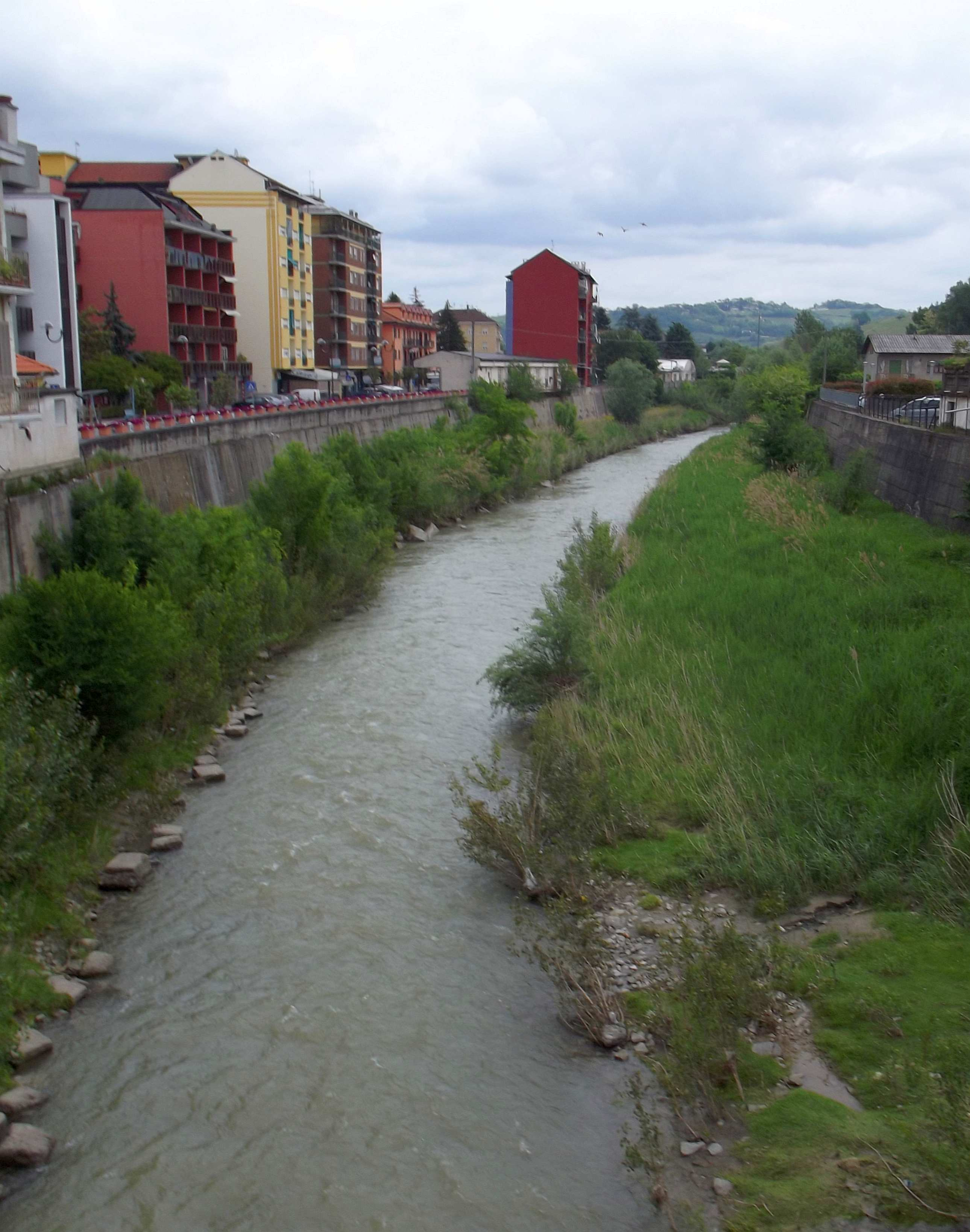
- The Belbo in Canelli

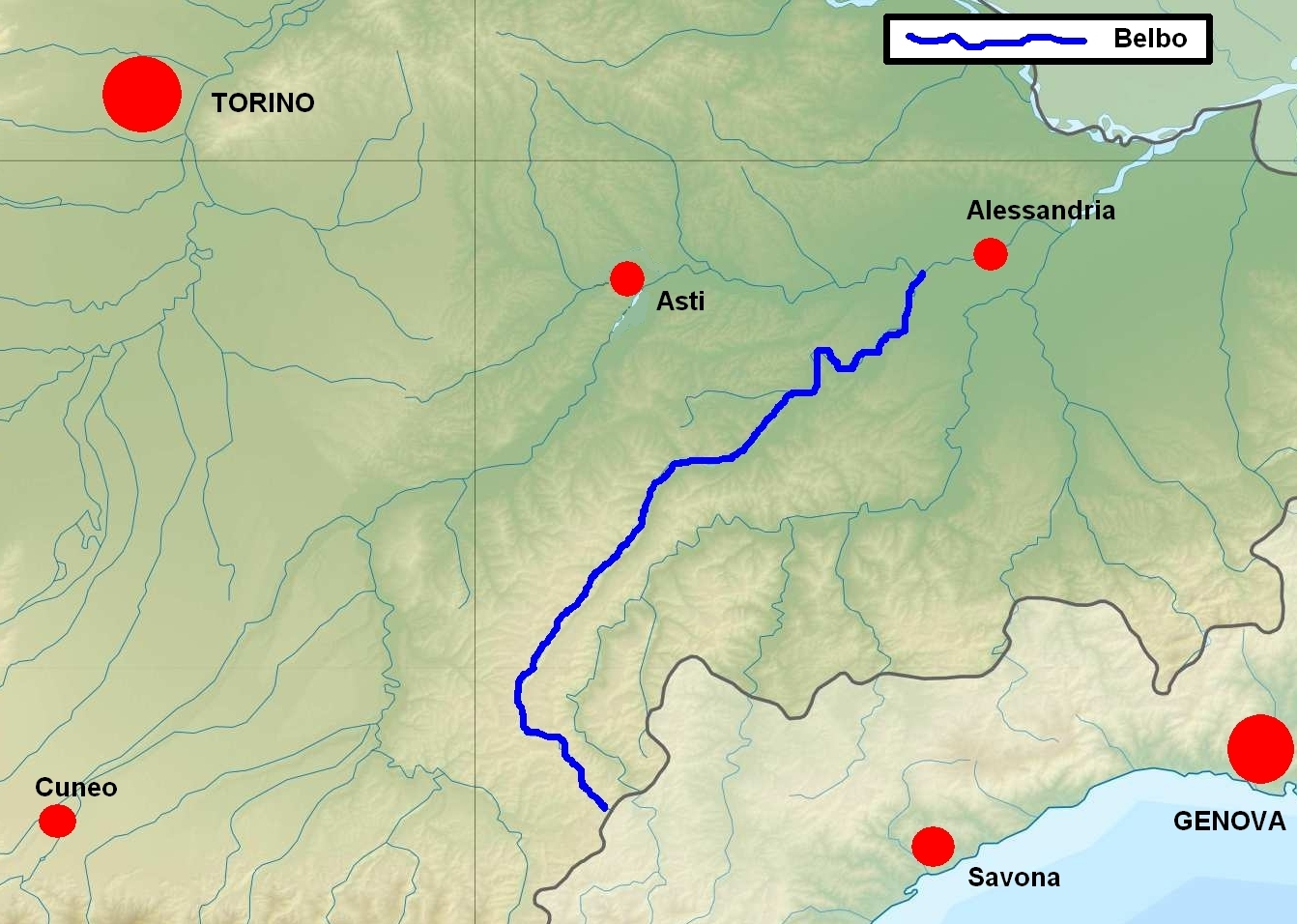
- Location within southern Piedmont

Location
- Country: Italy

Physical characteristics
- Source
  - location: Colli di Montezemolo, Langhe
  - elevation: 800 m (2,600 ft)
- Mouth: Tanaro
  - coordinates: 44.8950°N 8.5259°E
- Length: 94.9 km (59.0 mi)
- Basin size: 468.6 km^{2} (180.9 mi^{2})
- Discharge
  - average: (mouth) 5.1 m^{3}/s (180 cu ft/s)

Basin features
- Progression: Tanaro
- Tributaries
  - left: Tinella

The Belbo is a river of southern Piedmont, Italy. It is a right-side tributary of the Tanaro.

== Geography ==
The Belbo rises in the Langhe, on the borders between Piedmont and Liguria in the hills of Montezemolo. After flowing through the Piedmontese provinces of Cuneo, Asti and Alessandria, the river joins the Tanaro from the right at Villa del Foro, in the comune of Alessandria.

== Other projects ==
Media related to Belbo at Wikimedia Commons
