= Castiglione Tinella =

- Comune
- Comune di Castiglione Tinella
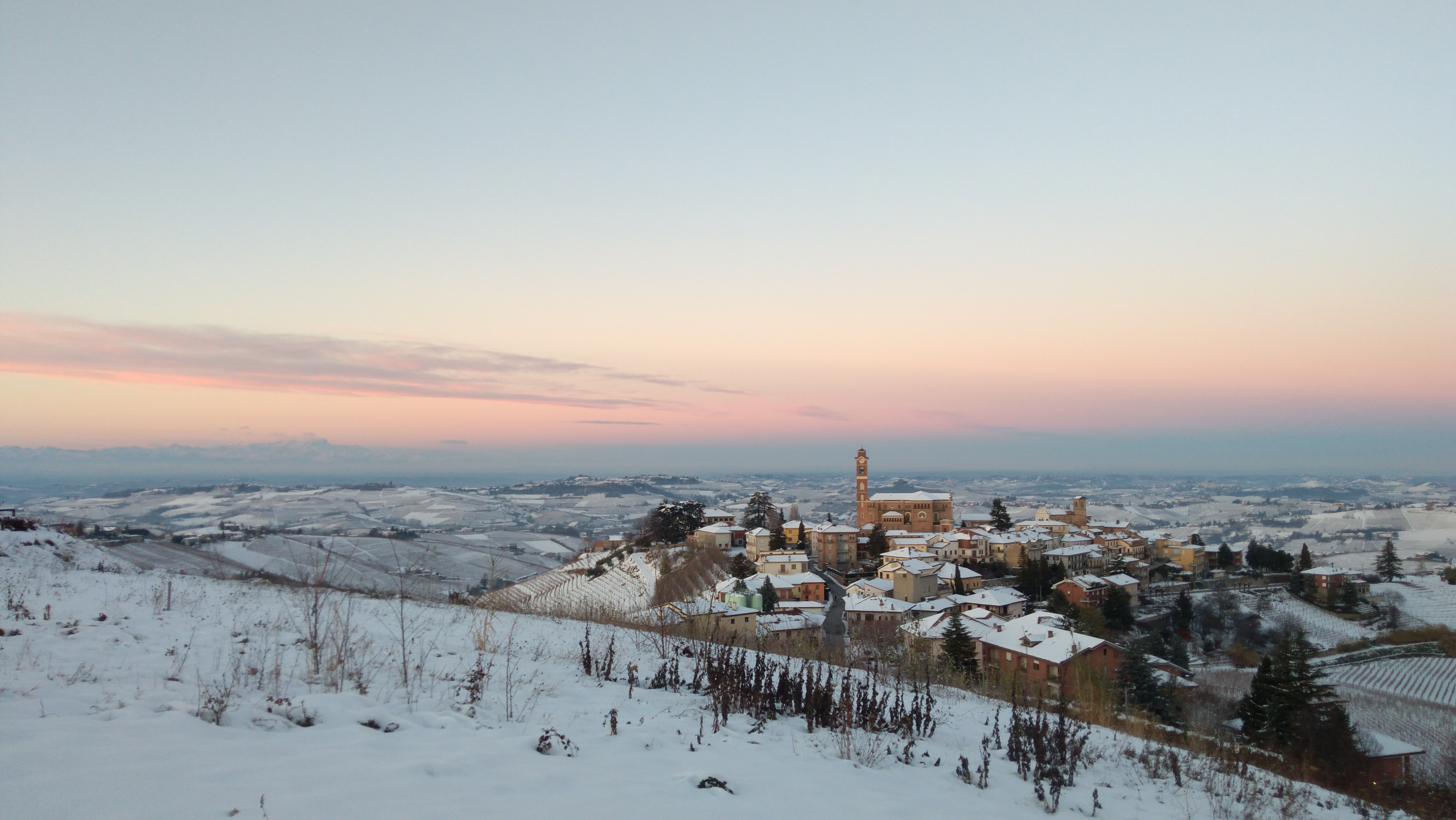

- Coat of arms

- Location within Italy Location within Piedmont
- Coordinates: 44°44′N 8°11′E
- Country: Italy
- Region: Piedmont
- Province: Province of Cuneo (CN)
- Frazioni: Balbi, San Carlo, San Giorgio, San Martino

Government
  - Mayor: Bruno Penna

Area
  - Total: 11.6 km^{2} (4.5 sq mi)
- Elevation: 408 m (1,339 ft)

Population (31 May 2007)
  - Total: 842
  - Density: 72.6/km^{2} (188/sq mi)
- Demonym: Castiglionesi
- Time zone: UTC+1 (CET)
  - Summer (DST): UTC+2 (CEST)
- Postal code: 12053
- Dialing code: 0141
- Website: Official website

Castiglione Tinella is a comune (municipality) in the Province of Cuneo in the Italian region Piedmont, located about 50 kilometres (31 mi) southeast of Turin and about 60 kilometres (37 mi) northeast of Cuneo.
