= Muscat Blanc à Petits Grains =

Variety of grape

- Grape (Vitis)
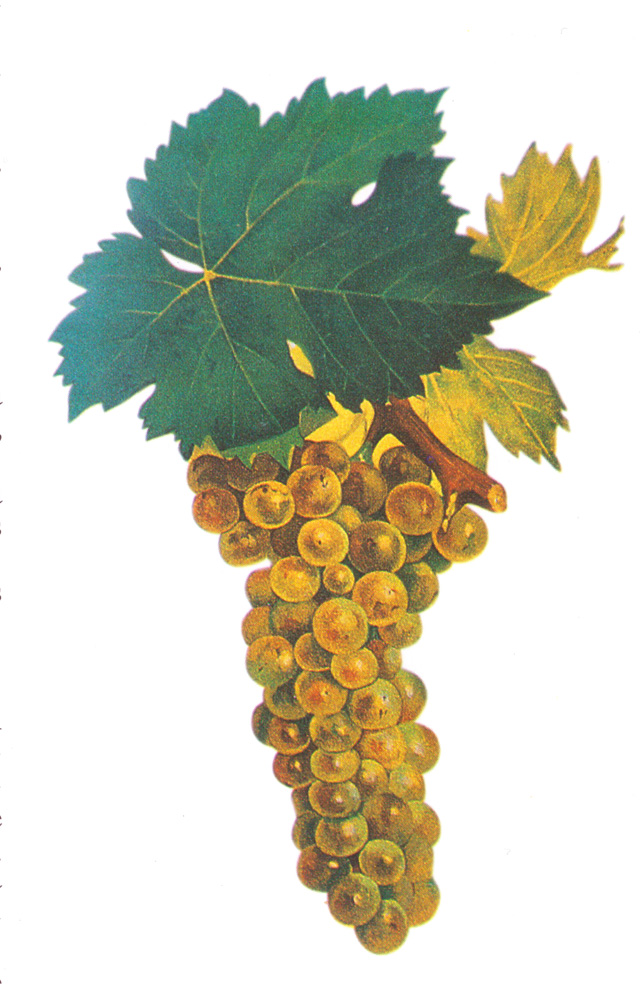
- Muscat Blanc à Petits Grains in Viala & Vermorel
- Color of berry skin: Blanc
- Species: Vitis vinifera
- Also called: See list of synonyms
- Origin: Greece
- Original pedigree: Muscat of Alexandria
- VIVC number: 8193

Muscat Blanc à Petits Grains (French pronunciation: [myska blɑ̃ a pəti ɡʁɛ̃]) is a white wine grape of Greek origin that is a member of the Muscat family of Vitis vinifera. Its name comes from its characteristic small berry size and tight clusters. It is known under a variety of local names such as Moscato bianco, Muscat blanc, Muscat Canelli, Muscat de Frontignan, Muscat de Lunel, Muscat d'Alsace, Muskateller, Moscatel de Grano Menudo, Moscatel rosé and Sárgamuskotály.

While technically a white grape, there are strains of Muscat Blanc à Petits Grains vines that produce berries that are pink or reddish brown. The same vine could potentially produce berries of one color one year and a different color the next. These strains are more prevalent in Australia, where the grape is also known as Frontignac and Brown Muscat. South Africa's Muskadel strain tends to show the same darker characteristics. Variants where the differing grape colour is stable are typically classified as separate grape varieties Muscat Rouge à Petit Grains for red skin colour and Muscat Rose à Petit Grains for pink skin colour.

== Uses ==
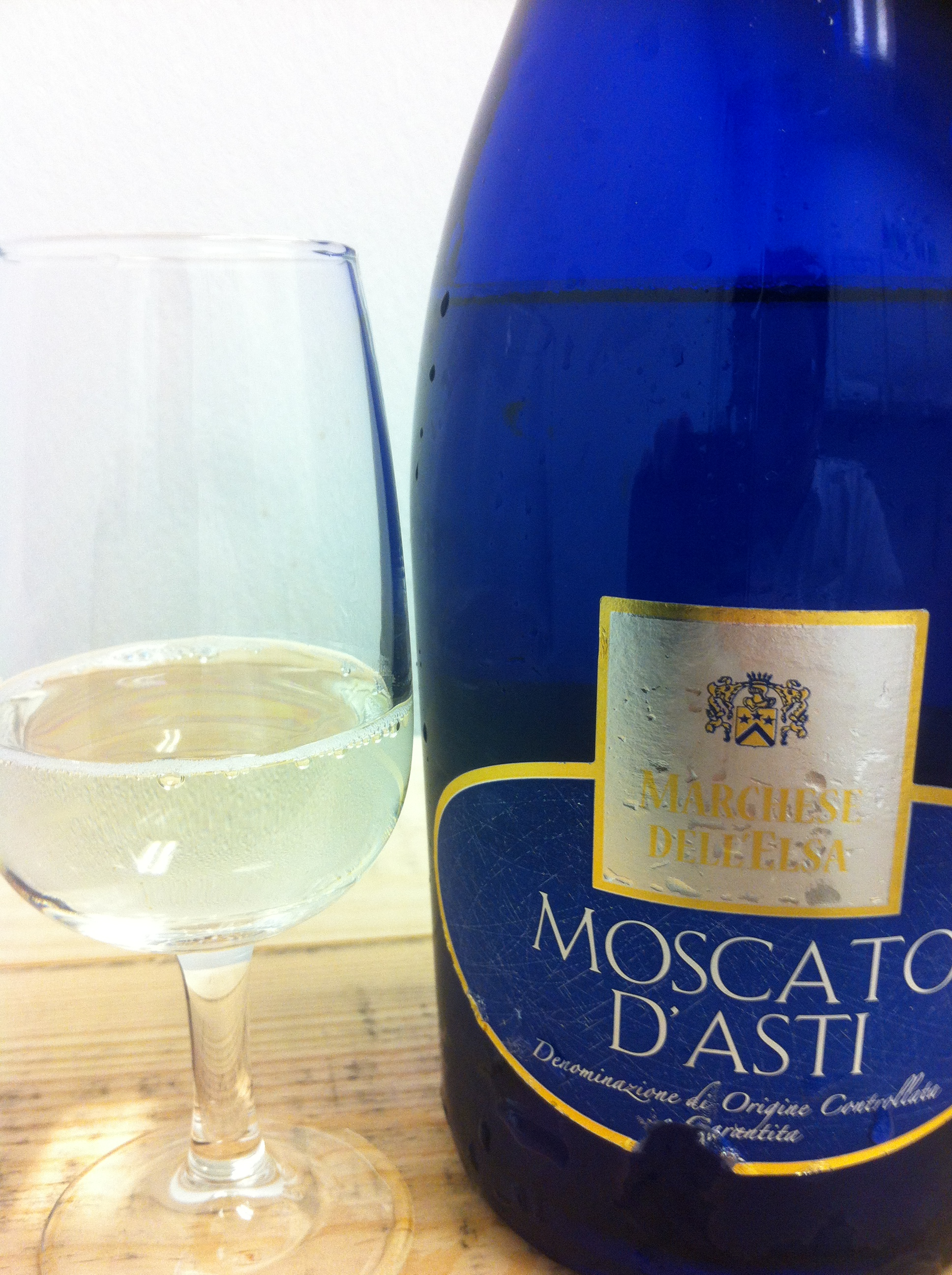
A Moscato d'Asti wine from Piedmont, Italy

In Greece, the grape is most important on the island of Samos and near Patras in the Peloponnese. On Samos, it produces a Vin Doux Naturel, aromatic dry white wines and a Liastos or straw wine. The high quality wines come from vineyards between 500 and 1000 metres above sea level. Samos now reinvents itself as a winemaking region, with emerging independent producers focusing more on dry, or even sparkling styles. Near Patras it is used to produce a Vin Doux Naturel. The grape is found throughout Greece however, with Spina in Crete being a notable mention, specialising on dry wines.

In Italy, the grape is the most widely planted member of the Muscat family and is most commonly known as Moscato Bianco. It is the oldest known variety grown in Piedmont and is the primary component of the Asti and Moscato d'Asti wines, as well as for the aromatized and fortified vermouths. It is also commonly used for fortified dessert wines as well as the semi-sparkling Frizzante.

In France, the grape is used as a blending grape with Grenache blanc and Muscat of Alexandria in vins doux naturels wines from the Frontignan area such as Banyuls, Côtes d'Agly, Grand Roussillon, Rivesaltes and St-Jean de Minervois. It is the primary grape in the Rhône wine Muscat de Beaumes-de-Venise and a blending grape with Clairette blanc in the recherché sparkling wine Clairette de Die (brand label Tradition). In Alsace, it is known for the highly aromatic and dry wines that it produces. In the Hérault region it is the primary grape for Muscat de Mireval.

In Spain, the grape is primarily called Moscatel de Grano Menudo. It is the second most planted Muscat for wine. It is found across Spain, with the majority of the plantings in Castilla-La Mancha. Spain grew 21,902 hectares (54,121 acres) of Moscatel de Grano Menudo in 2015.

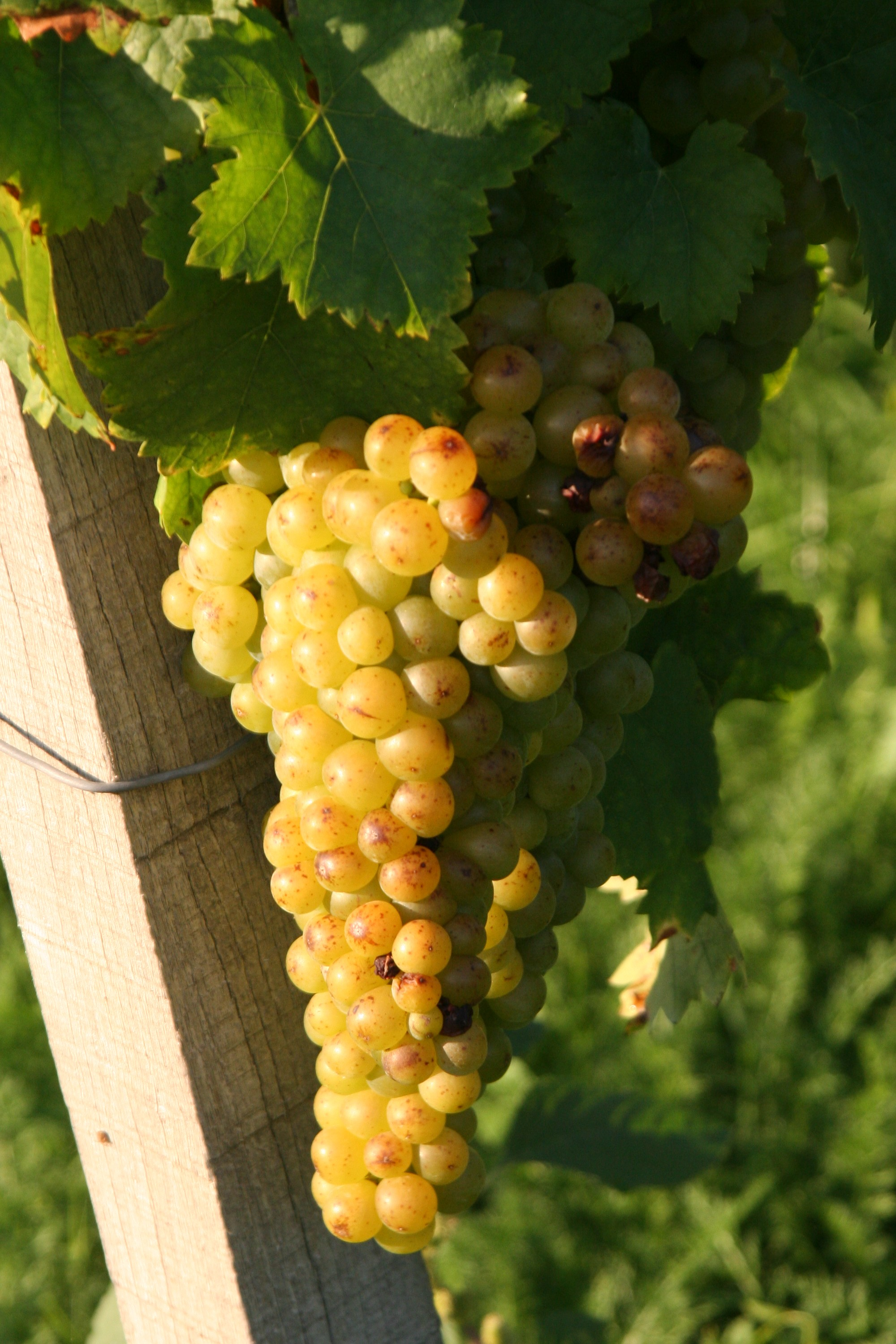
Muscat Blanc à Petits Grains growing in Weinsberg under the synonym Gelber Muskateller

== Viticulture ==
Its viticultural characteristics makes it prone to producing low yields and a susceptibility to mildew and the grape berry moth. It also tends to fall victim to leaf roll, odium and grey rot and requires a long growing season as it tends to bud early and ripen late. It ripens early in Australia for production of low alcohol moscato style wines. Picking can commence in early February. Picking for fortified production can take place in mid-March; this would be regarded as mid-season, not late. Muscat blanc à petits grains is one of the first harvests in France, starting as early as mid August, in Mireval and other areas of the mediterranean basin, in hot dry years like 2009. The grapes used to produce the fruity sec are picked about seven to ten days earlier than the grapes used to produce the Vin Doux Naturel. Vendange tardive (late harvest) of the grapes is also made to exploit the high sugar and flavour concentrations.

== History ==
Ampelographers have identified the grape with the Anathelicon moschaton grape used by the Ancient Greeks and the Apiane vines planted by the Romans (so named because of the fondness that insects, such as bees (Latin apis), have for devouring the flesh of the grapes). It was probably first introduced to France by the Greeks through their trading port at Marseille and later spread to the Narbonne region by Romans in their conquest of Gaul. It was a chief export of Frontignan by the time of Charlemagne and plantings were recorded in Germany by the 12th century. It became a popular planting in Alsace by the 16th century. It was introduced to South Africa in the 18th century and became the mainstay of the famous Vin de Constance. It is believed that the grapes were sourced in Frontignan.

== Synonyms ==
Muscat Blanc à Petits Grains is known under a large number of synonyms, the more popular of which include Muscat Canelli, various combinations with the word Frontignan. In Greece it's simply known as White Muscat (or Aspro Moschato). In Bulgaria it is known as Tamyanka, in North Macedonia as Temjanika, and in Serbia as Tamjanika. In Hungary, the variety is known as Sárgamuskotály. In Austria (and Germany), it is known as Gelber Muskateller. In Spain, it is called Moscatel de Grano Menudo, Moscatel Castellano, Moscatel Commun, Moscatel de Frontignan, Moscatel de Grano Pequeño, Moscatel Fino, Moscatel Morisco, and Moscatell Gra Menut in Catalan.

This grape is often confused with the distinct and separate grape varieties Muscat of Alexandria (a.k.a. Zibibbo in Sicily, Hanepoot in South Africa) and Muscat Ottonel, most common in Austria and Alsace but originally bred in Loire Valley in 1852.

Wines mentioning just Muscat or Moscato on the label often come from a blend of different varieties in the Muscat family.
