= Rapisarda =

Rapisarda is an Italian surname. Notable people with the surname include:

- Alberto Rapisarda (born 1964), Italian comics artist
- Alfio Rapisarda (1933–2026), Vatican diplomat
- Francesco Rapisarda (born 1992), Italian footballer
- Giuseppe Rapisarda (born 1985), Swiss footballer
