= Saint Mark Between Saints Leonard and Catherine of Alexandria =

Painting by Francesco Beccaruzzi

San Marco tra San Leonardo e Santa Caterina d'Alessandria
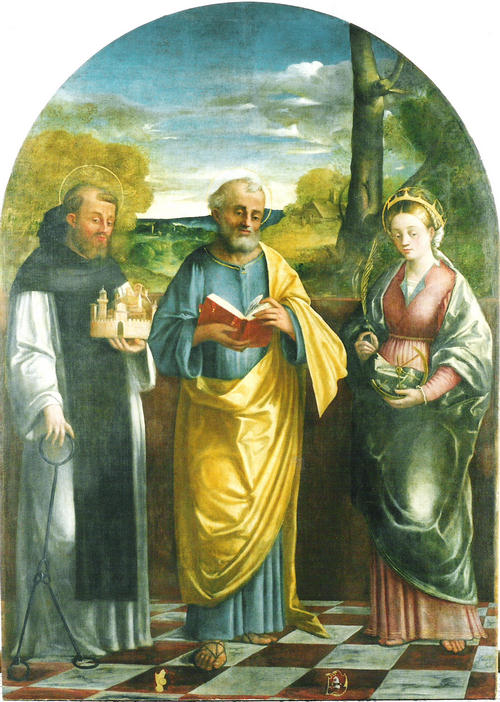
- Artist: Francesco Beccaruzzi
- Year: 1504
- Medium: Oil on wood
- Location: Conegliano

St Mark with Saints Leonard and Catherine of Alexandria (Italian San Marco tra San Leonardo e Santa Caterina d'Alessandria) is an oil painting by Francesco Beccaruzzi. It is preserved in the cathedral in Conegliano, the artist's hometown.
