= Tullio De Rosa =

Italian enologist and author (1923–1994)

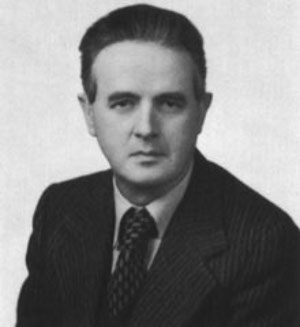
- Born: 1923; Spilimbergo, Italy
- Died: 1994 (aged 70–71); Conegliano, Italy
- Occupation: Enology

Tullio De Rosa (1923–1994) was an Italian enologist.

== Career ==
After graduation in Bologna in 1947, De Rosa started teaching in 1966 at the Istituto Sperimentale di Enologia in Conegliano, (formerly part of the Scuola Enologica di Conegliano), that he lately directed for several years, the most relevant titles among his wide bibliography include the classic handbooks Tecnologia dei Vini Bianchi (White Wines Production Technology), Tecnologia dei Vini Spumanti (Sparkling Wines Production Technology), Tecnologia dei Vini Rossi (Red Wines Production Technology) and Tuttovini (translated in several languages), and the collection of autobiographical novels Andar Per Vini that in the 1970 first edition was accompanied by illustrations by the Italian artist Renato Varese. In 2011 the posthumous book Guida alla degustazione del vino: la valutazione edonistica. Concetti propedeutici e formativi esposti in maniera utilizzabile da un ampio ambito di lettori (originally manuscripted by De Rosa during his last days of illness between June and August 1994) was finally published jointly by the Microbiological Institute in Rauscedo and Faenza Editore.
