= Conegliano =

Italian town in Veneto

- Comune
- Città di Conegliano
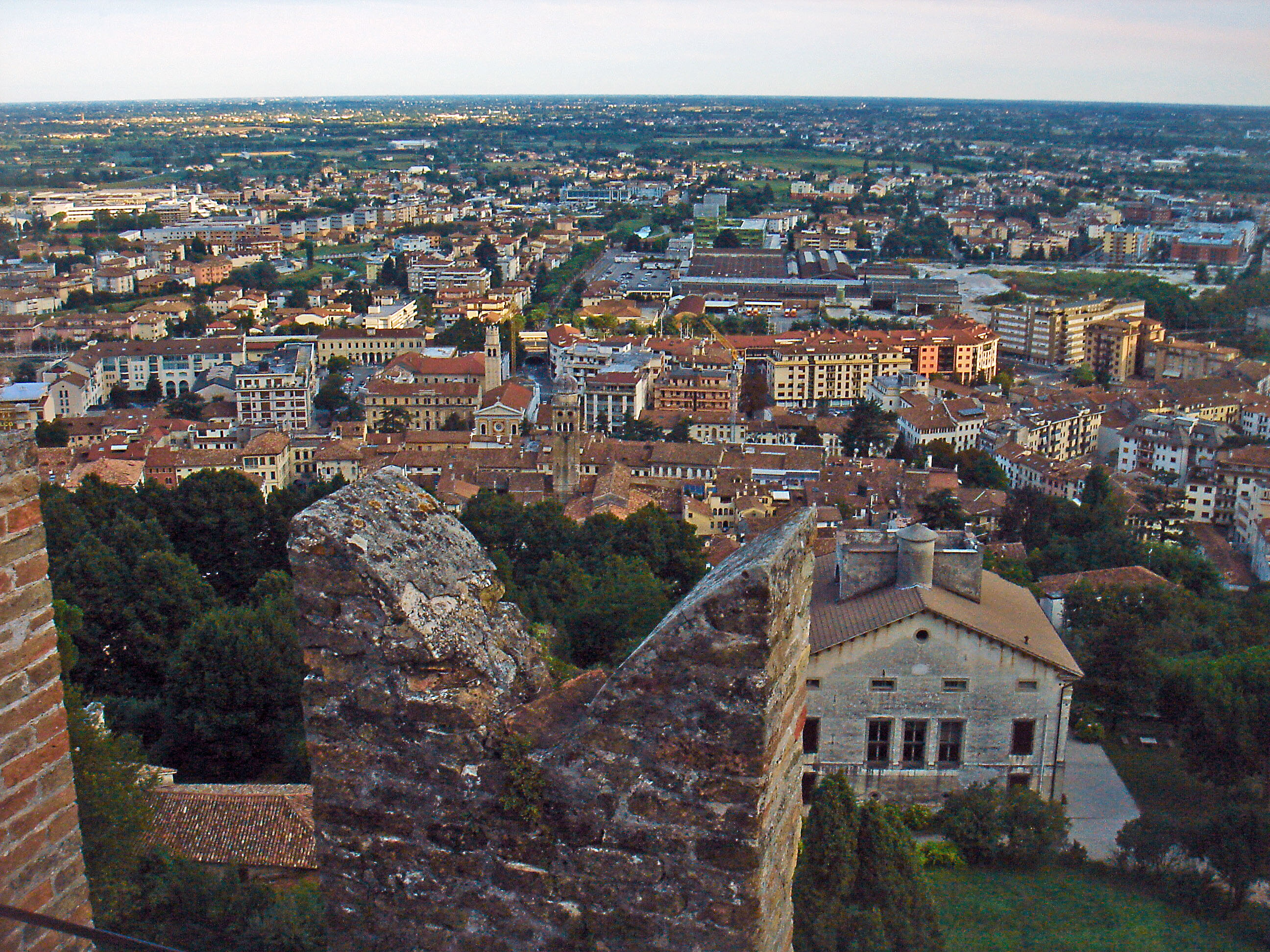
- Conegliano as seen from the castle in 2008

- Flag Coat of arms

- Location of Conegliano in Italy Conegliano (Veneto)
- Coordinates: 45°53′12.32″N 12°17′50.6″E
- Country: Italy
- Region: Veneto
- Province: Treviso (TV)
- Frazioni: Ogliano, Scomigo, Collalbrigo, Costa, Parè, Campolongo (Hasplkhnott)

Government
  - Mayor: Fabio Chies

Area
  - Total: 36 km^{2} (14 sq mi)
- Elevation: 74 m (243 ft)

Population (30 September 2017)
  - Total: 35,023
  - Density: 970/km^{2} (2,500/sq mi)
- Demonym: Coneglianesi
- Time zone: UTC+1 (CET)
  - Summer (DST): UTC+2 (CEST)
- Postal code: 31015
- Dialing code: 0438
- Patron saint: Leonard of Noblac
- Saint day: November 6
- Website: Official website

UNESCO World Heritage Site
- Official name: Le Colline del Prosecco di Conegliano e Valdobbiadene
- Criteria: Cultural: (v)
- Designated: 2019 (43rd session)
- Reference no.: 1571
- Region: Southern Europe
- Area: 20,334.2 ha
- Buffer Zone: 43,998.2 ha

Conegliano (Italian: [koneʎˈʎaːno]; Venetian: Conejan) is a town and comune of the Veneto region of Italy in the province of Treviso, about 30 kilometres (19 mi) north by rail from the town of Treviso. As of 30 September 2017, the population of the city is of 35,023 people. The remains of a 10th-century castle are situated on a hill that dominates the town. Formerly belonging to the Bishop of Vittorio Veneto, what remains is a bell tower, which now houses a small museum, and outer walls. On 7 July 2019, Le Colline del Prosecco di Conegliano e Valdobbiadene was inscribed as a UNESCO World Heritage Site.

== History ==
=== Medieval and early modern periods ===
In the 10th century, the Castle of Conegliano was established under the control of the Bishop of Belluno. The origin of the name "Conegliano" likely derives itself from Latin cuniculus meaning "underground tunnel". Control of the area was passed over first to the March of Treviso in 1153, and then the Republic of Venice in 1337. In the 1300s, a village was established by a group of noble families around the castle. During the Middle Ages, the castle served as the centre of power in Conegliano, being both the seat of the town's podestà and religious functions. Under Trevigiani and Venetian control, Conegliano's fortifications were strengthened. However, Conegliano entered a state of decline following the end of the War of the League of Cambrai. Between the end of the 1300s and 1800s, Conegliano was home to a Jewish community. In 1629, the Jewish community was forcibly relocated to the bottom of the castle's hill, before being again moved in 1675 to outside the town's walls. The community built a new synagogue within the ghetto in 1701; following its abandonment after World War I, the entire interior was dismantled and transferred to Jerusalem in 1951, where it was reconstructed as the Italian Synagogue of Jerusalem.

=== 1800s to present ===
Following the end of the Napoleonic Wars, Conegliano came under Austrian control as part of the Kingdom of Lombardy-Venetia. Under Austrian control, Conegliano underwent civil growth and development. In World War I, following the Italian defeat at Battle of Caporetto, Italian troops began retreating to the Piave river with Conegliano becoming an important transit point. The German-Austrian advance meant the town was occupied on 1 November 1917. It remained under the occupation of the Central Powers up to 24 October 1918 after the Italian victory at the Battle of Vittorio Veneto.

== Economy ==
Conegliano is noted for its wine, chiefly the dry white Prosecco (made from the glera grape) which comes in three varieties: tranquillo (still), frizzante (slightly sparkling) and spumante (sparkling). It is also home to Italy's oldest and most prestigious wine school called Scuola Enologica. It is also home to the Istituto Sperimentale per la Viticoltura where several Italian grape varieties have been bred, including Albarossa, Vega and Valentino nero. Additionally, viticulturalists at the institute have helped save many native Italian grape varieties from extinction, such as the Valpolicella grape Bigolona. There is also a great industrial tradition, especially specialized in home appliances.

=== Colli di Conegliano DOC ===
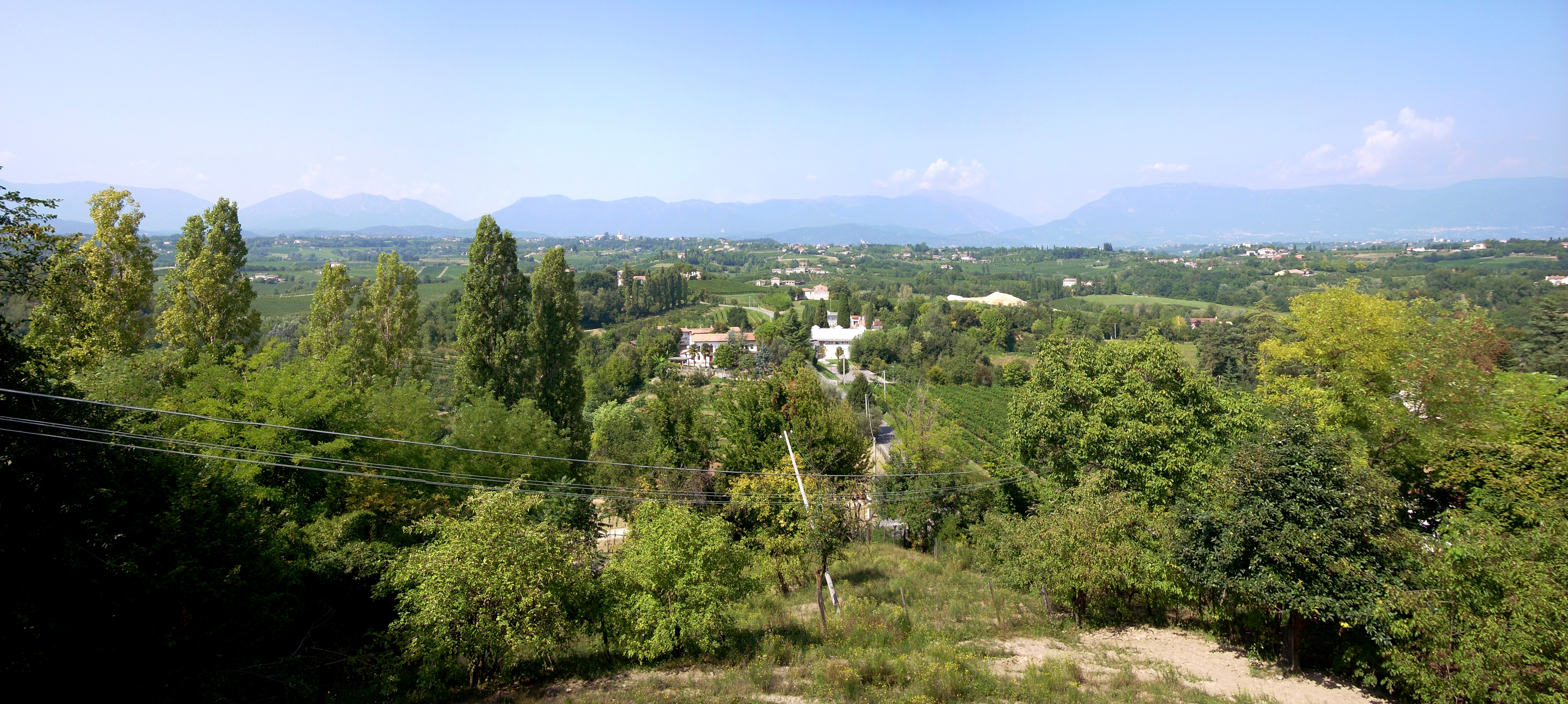
The vineyards of Conegliano

The hills around Conegliano are home to the Denominazione di origine controllata e garantita (DOCG) zone of Colli di Conegliano. There both red and white Italian wines are produced at a variety of sweetness levels from dry to sweet passito dessert wines. Grapes destined for DOC wine production must be harvested to a yield no greater than 12 tonnes/hectare. The finished wine must attain a minimum alcohol level of 12% for the red wines and 10.5% for the whites in order to be labelled with the Colli di Conegliano DOC designation.

The red DOC wines are made Merlot (10-40%), Cabernet Sauvignon, Cabernet Franc and Marzemino (at least 10% of each with no maximum for the last three varieties) and up 10% of Incrocio Manzoni 2.15. The wine is required to be aged at least two years in barrel prior to being released. A sweet red passito labeled as Refrontolo is made from at least 95% Marzemino with up 5% of other local non-aromatic varieties permitted to round out the blend.

The dry white of the DOC is made from at least 30% Manzoni bianco with between 30-70% collectively of Pinot blanc and Chardonnay and up to 10% total of Sauvignon blanc and Riesling Renano. The passito style Torchiato di Fregona can be made in both a dry and sweet style from at least 30% each of Glera and Verdiso, a minimum 25% of Boschera and up to 15% of non-aromatic varieties like Marzemina bianca and Bianchetta Trevigiana. This wine is required to age at least 13 months prior to being release.

== Culture ==
Every June, a special chess game (or draughts) where the pieces are represented by actual real people—known as the Dama Castellana—is performed in the historical center. This event is not the continuation of a secular tradition, but was introduced only a few years ago, yet still managed to become a traditional event in the Coneglianese calendar. Conegliano was the birthplace of the painters Cima da Conegliano, a fine altar-piece by whom is in the cathedral (dating to 1492), and Francesco Beccaruzzi, as well as the composer and conductor at the Cincinnati Conservatory, Pier Adolfo Tirindelli The town has one association football team called Conegliano who play in the Serie D, the fourth tier of the Italian football league system.

== Notable people ==
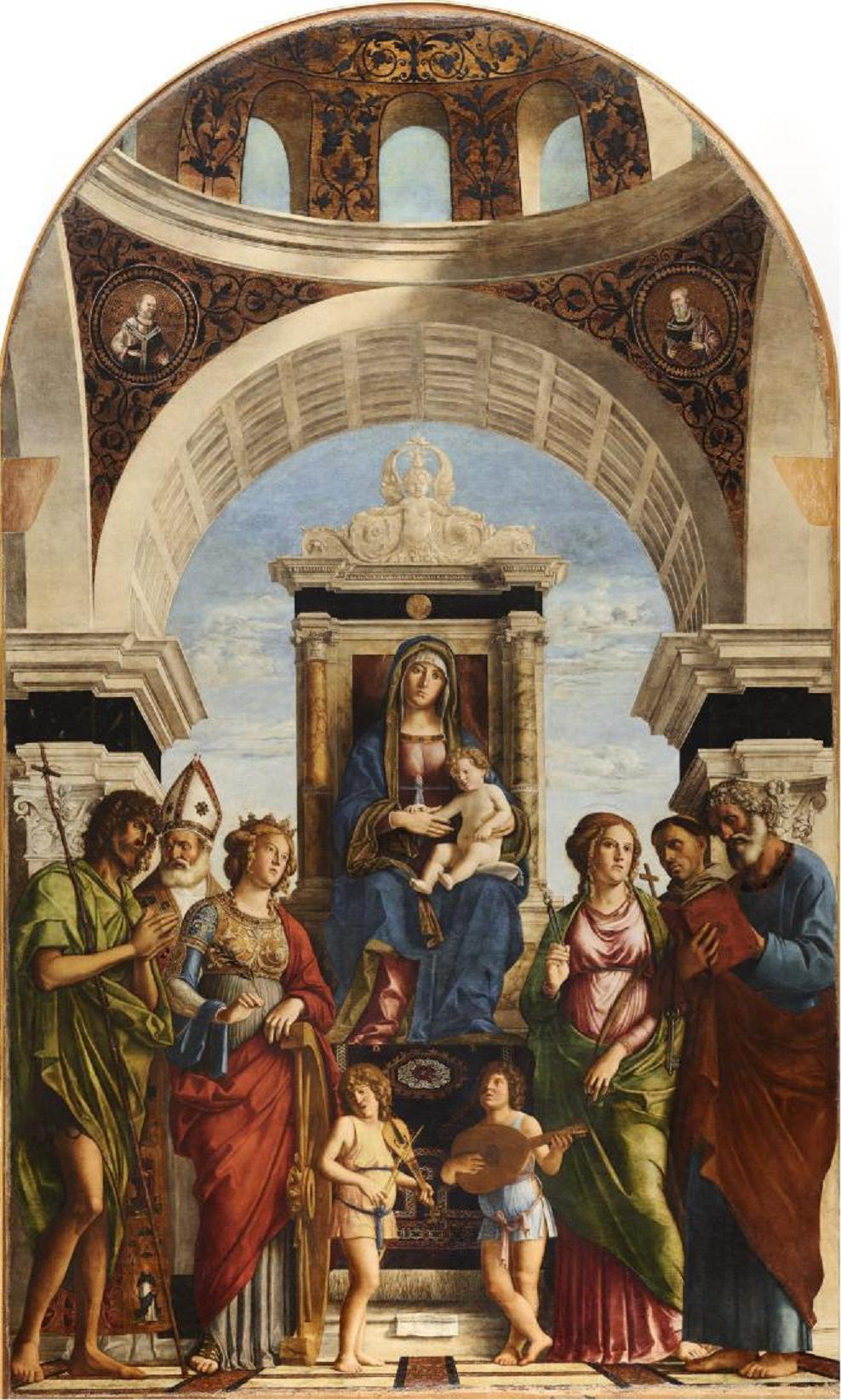
Conegliano Altarpiece by Cima da Conegliano in the Cathedral of Conegliano

- Francesco Beccaruzzi, painter
- Ferruccio Benini, actor
- Ugo Cerletti, a neurologist who discovered the method of electroconvulsive therapy in psychiatry
- Cima da Conegliano (born Giambattista Cima), Renaissance painter
- Paolo De Coppi, scientist
- Alessandro Del Piero, World Cup-winning footballer
- Marco Donadel, football coach and former midfielder
- Maurizio Zanetti, scientist immunologist
- Gino Girolamo Fanno, engineer
- Marco Fanno, economist
- Maurizio Sacconi, politician
- Alberto Rapisarda, illustrator
- Tullio De Rosa, enologist and novelist
- Stefano Curtarolo, materials scientist
- Bruna Pegoraro Brylawski, molecular biologist
- Francesco Gera, agronomist and sericulturist

== Transport ==
Taxis are often located at the Conegliano railway station to transport train riders to their final destination in the town.

== International relations ==
=== Twin towns and sister cities ===
Conegliano is twinned with:

- Garibaldi in Brazil
- Lismore in New South Wales, Australia

== Photo gallery ==
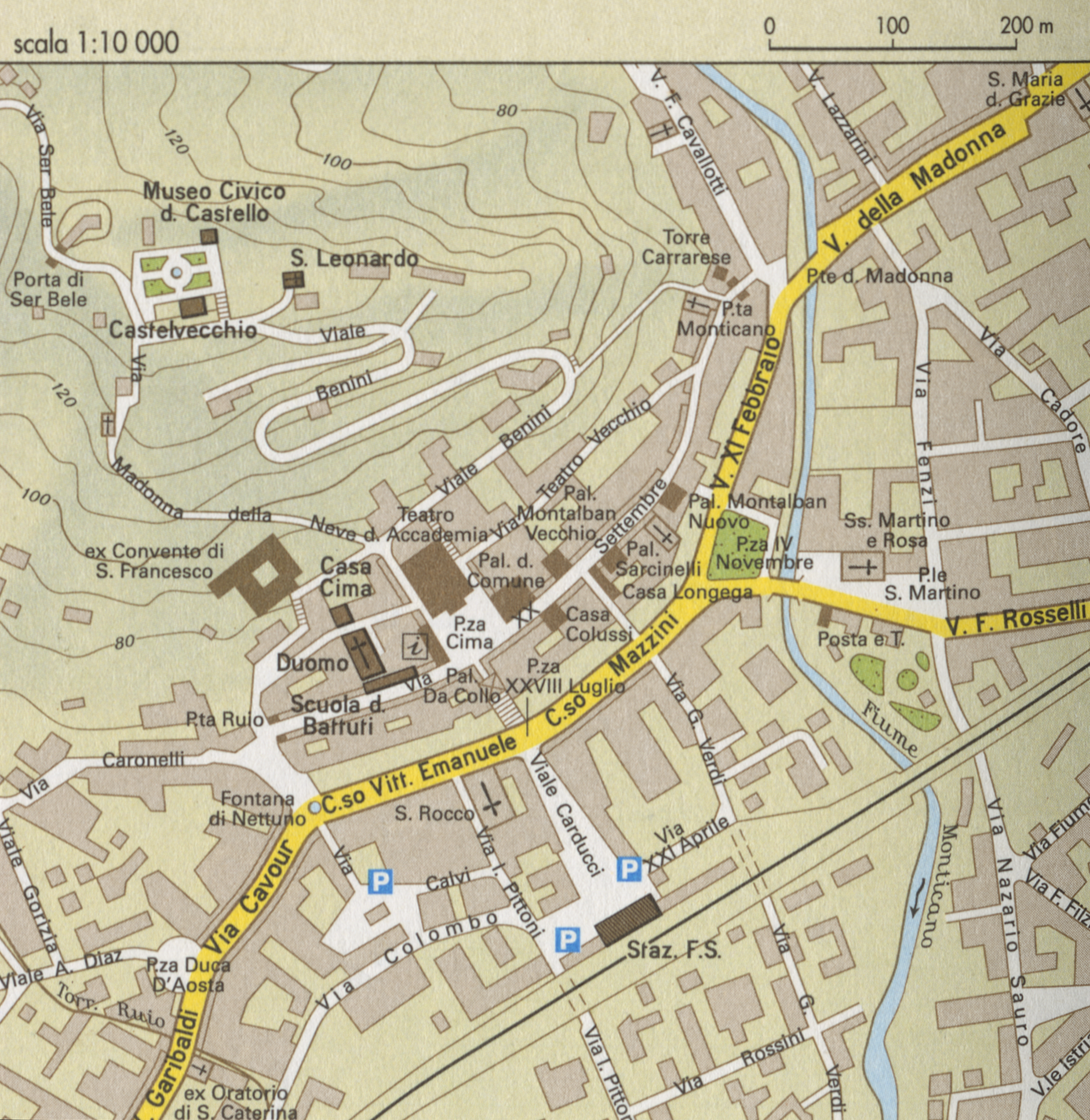
Map of city centre

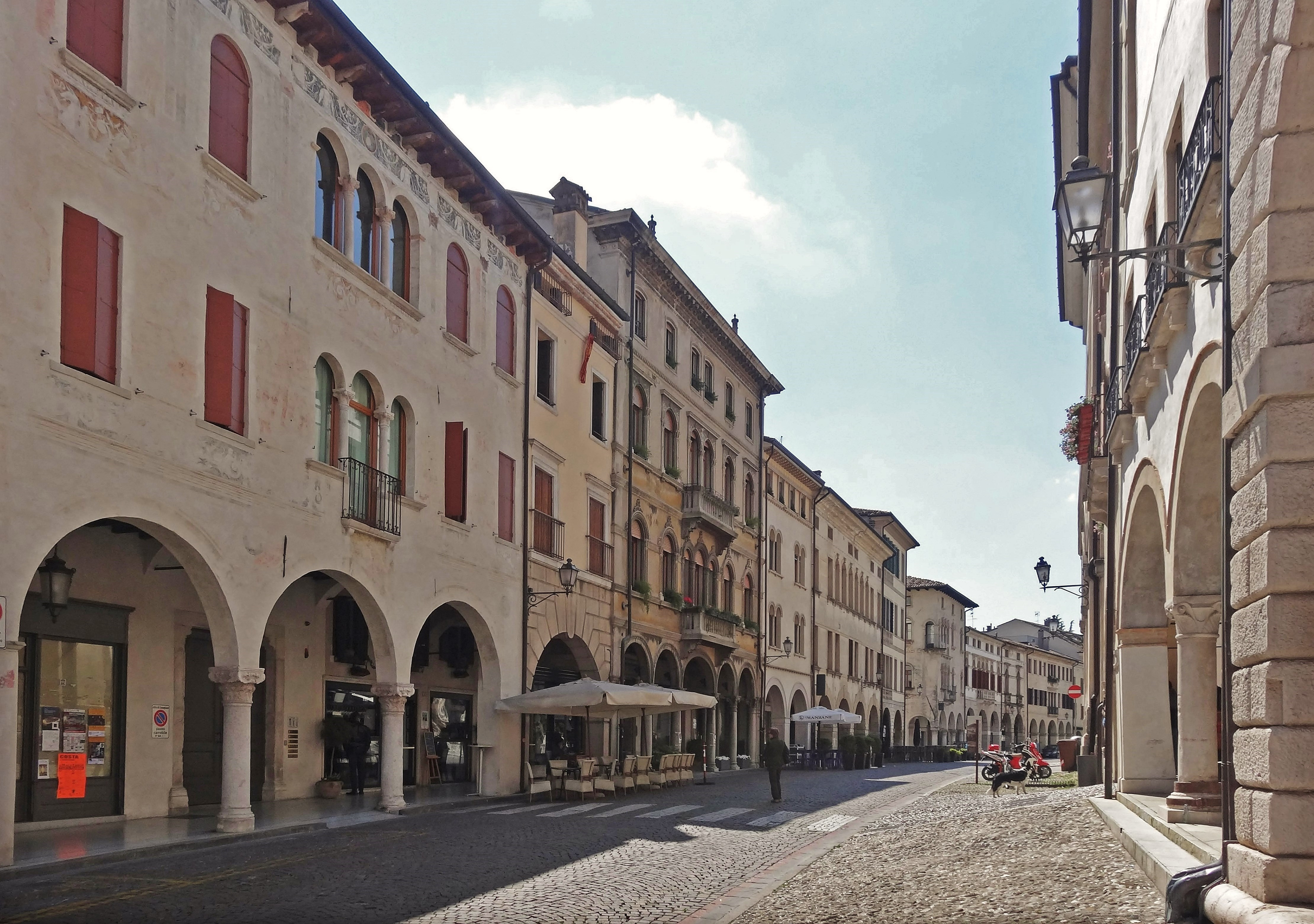
The center

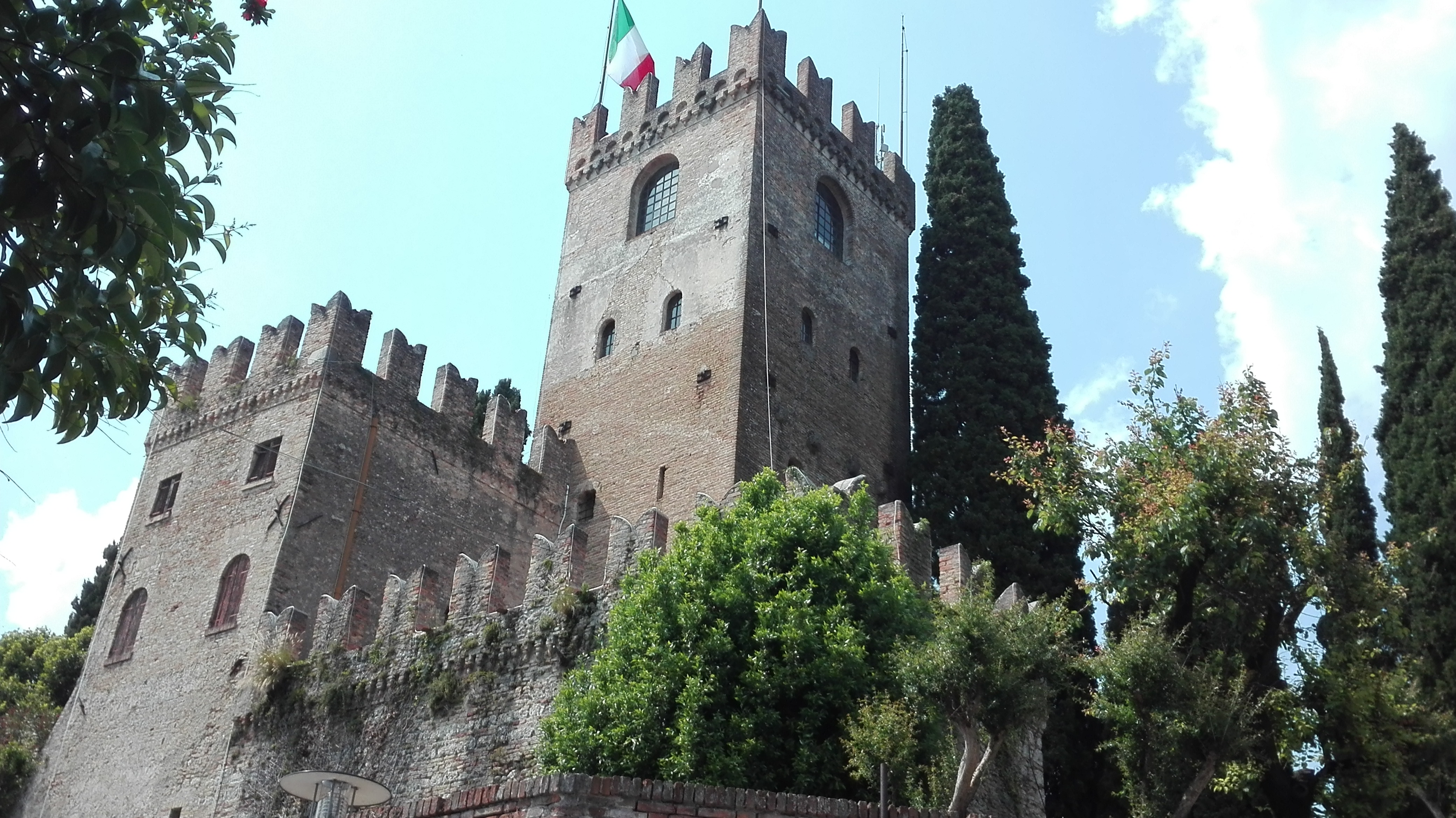
Middle Ages castle

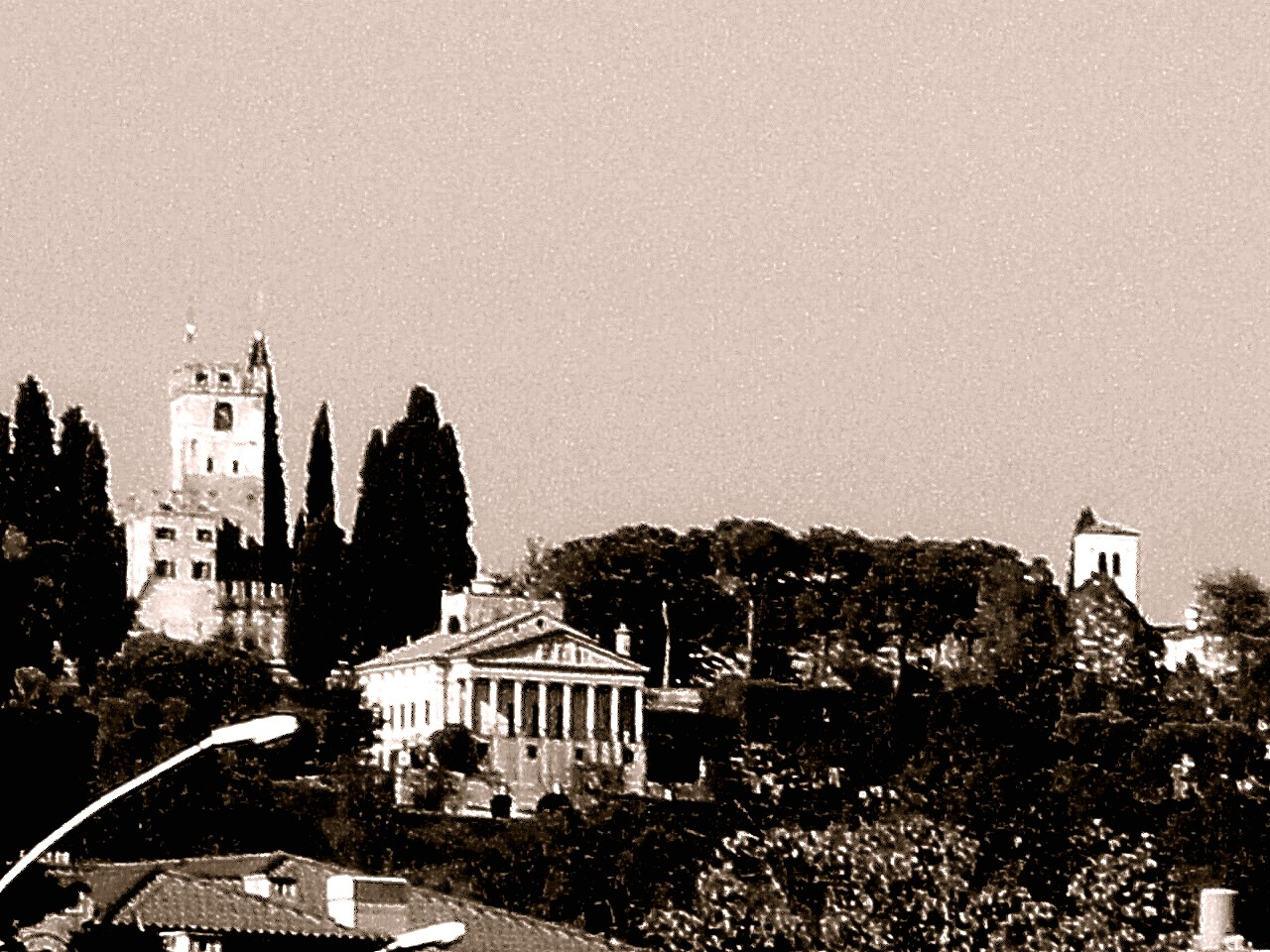
Giano hill with the castle and Villa Gera

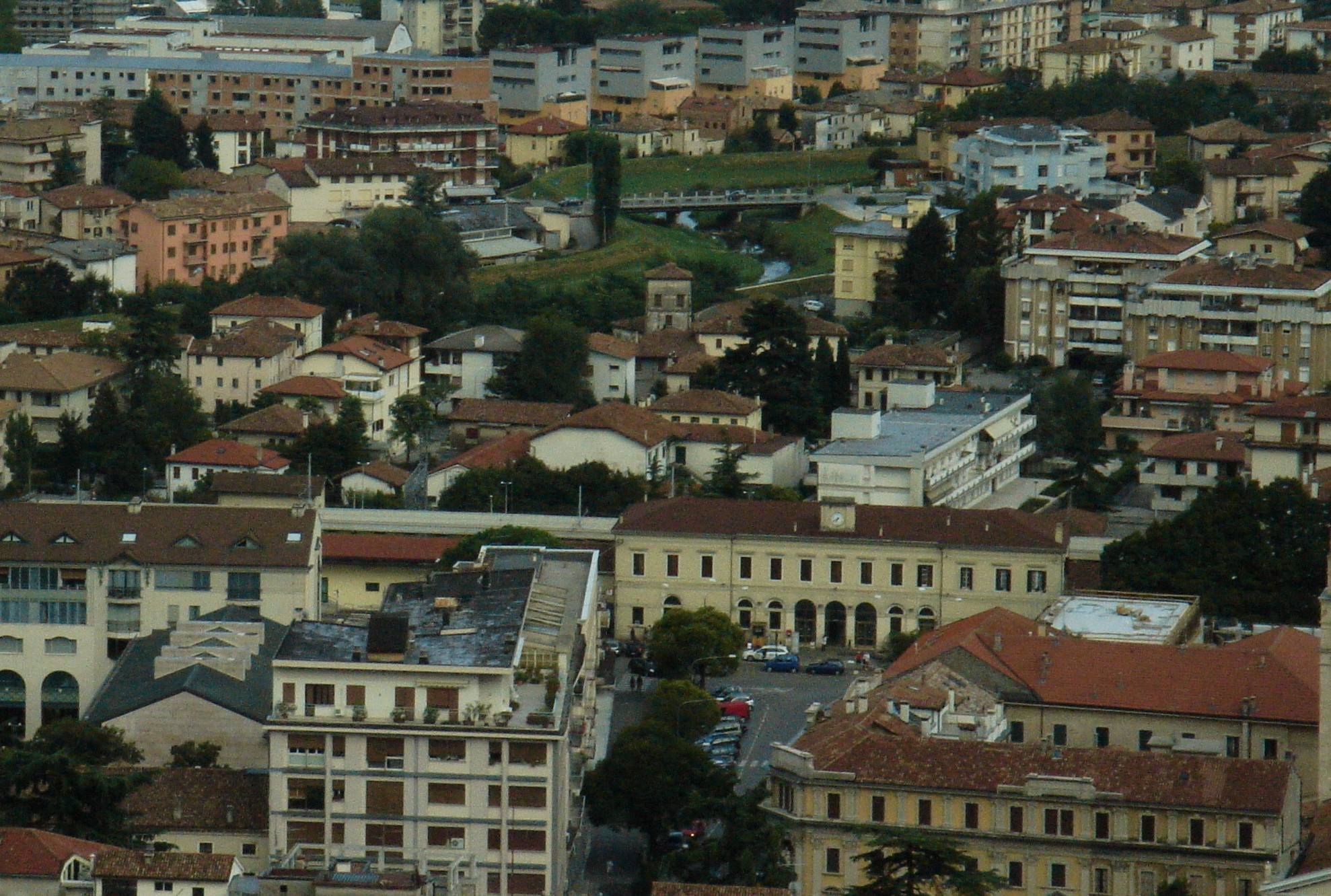
Panoramic view of the train station (from the castle)

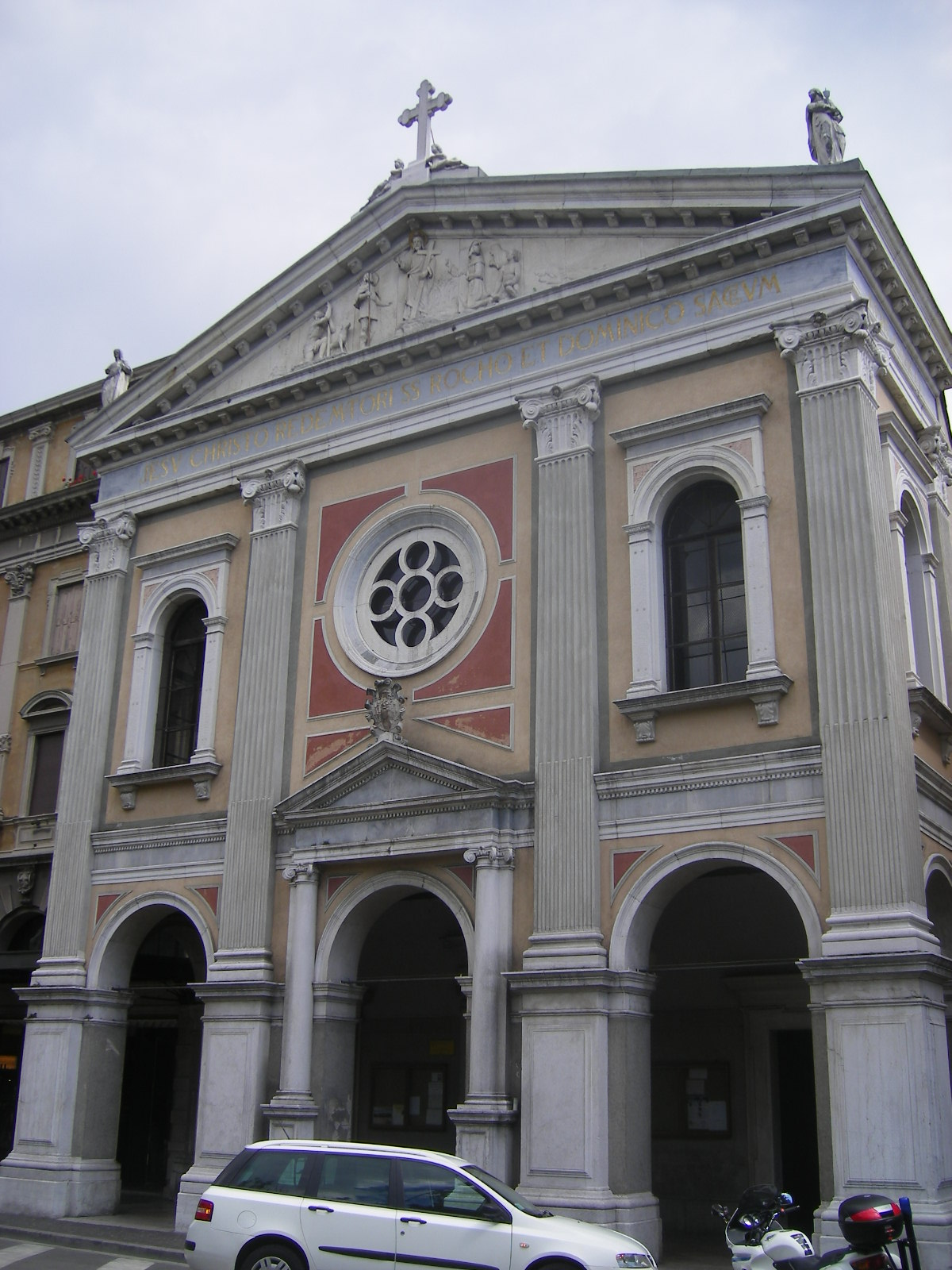
San Rocco Church

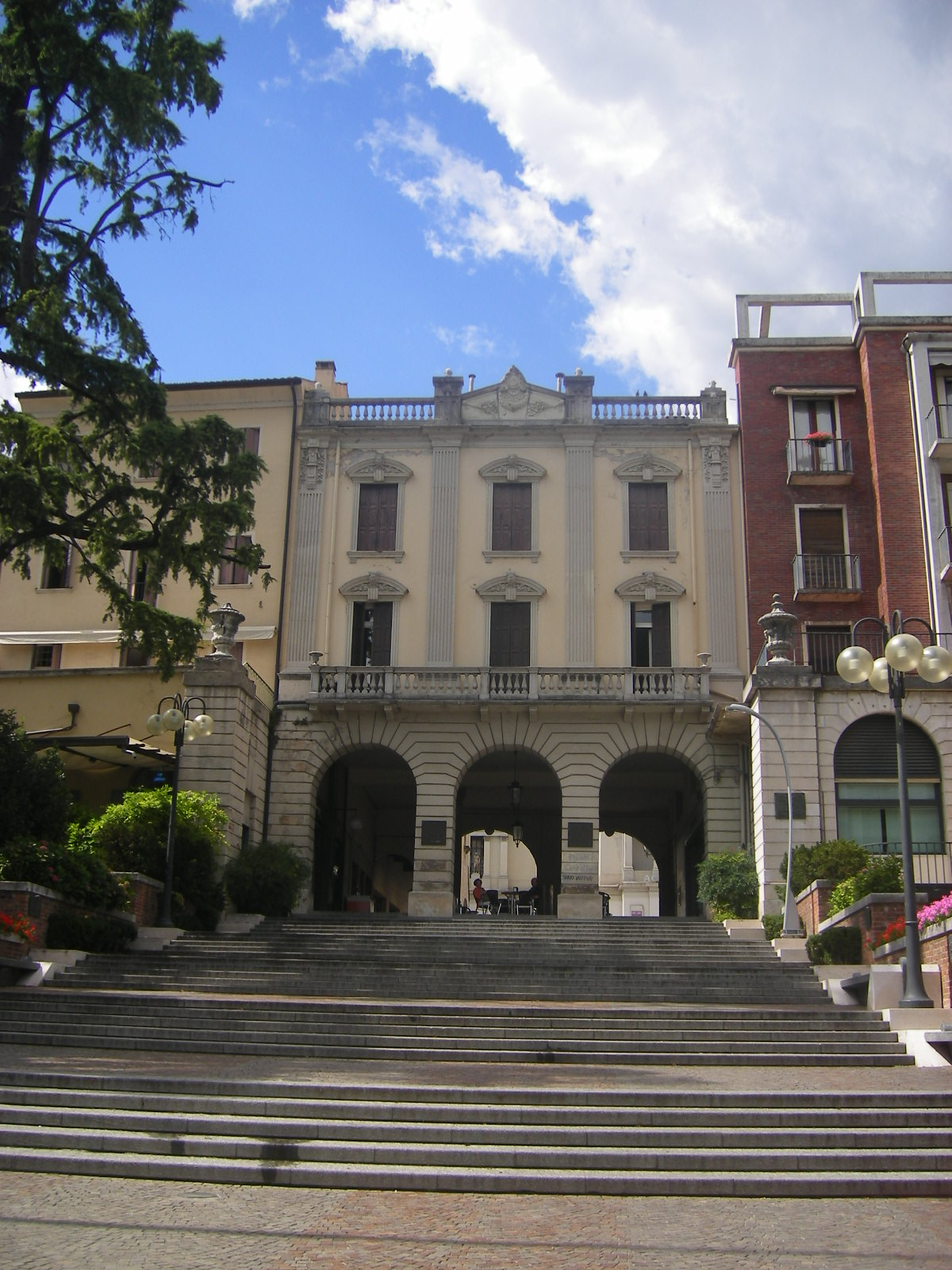
Scalinata degli Alpini (Alpines' flight of steps)

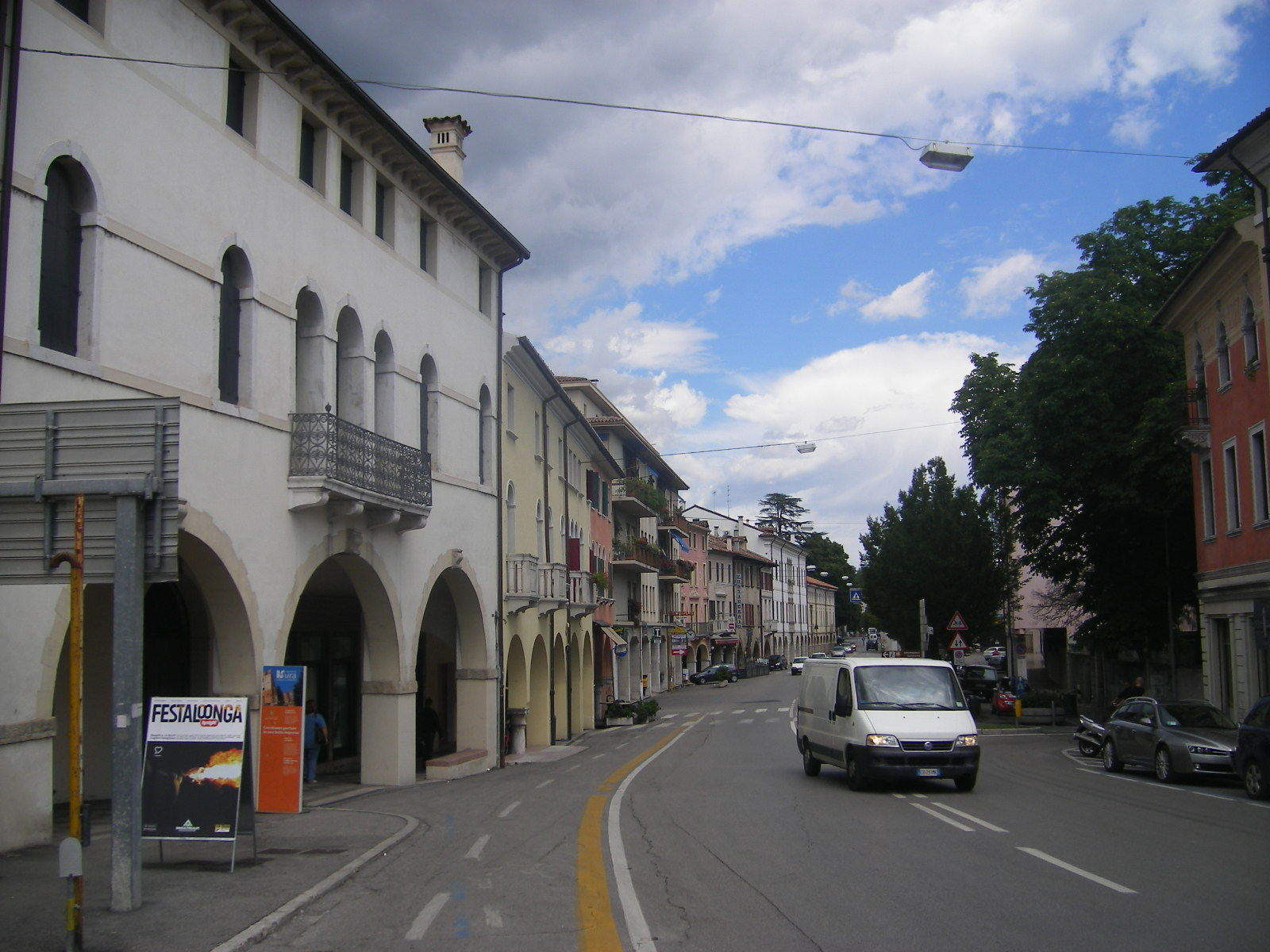
Via Madonna

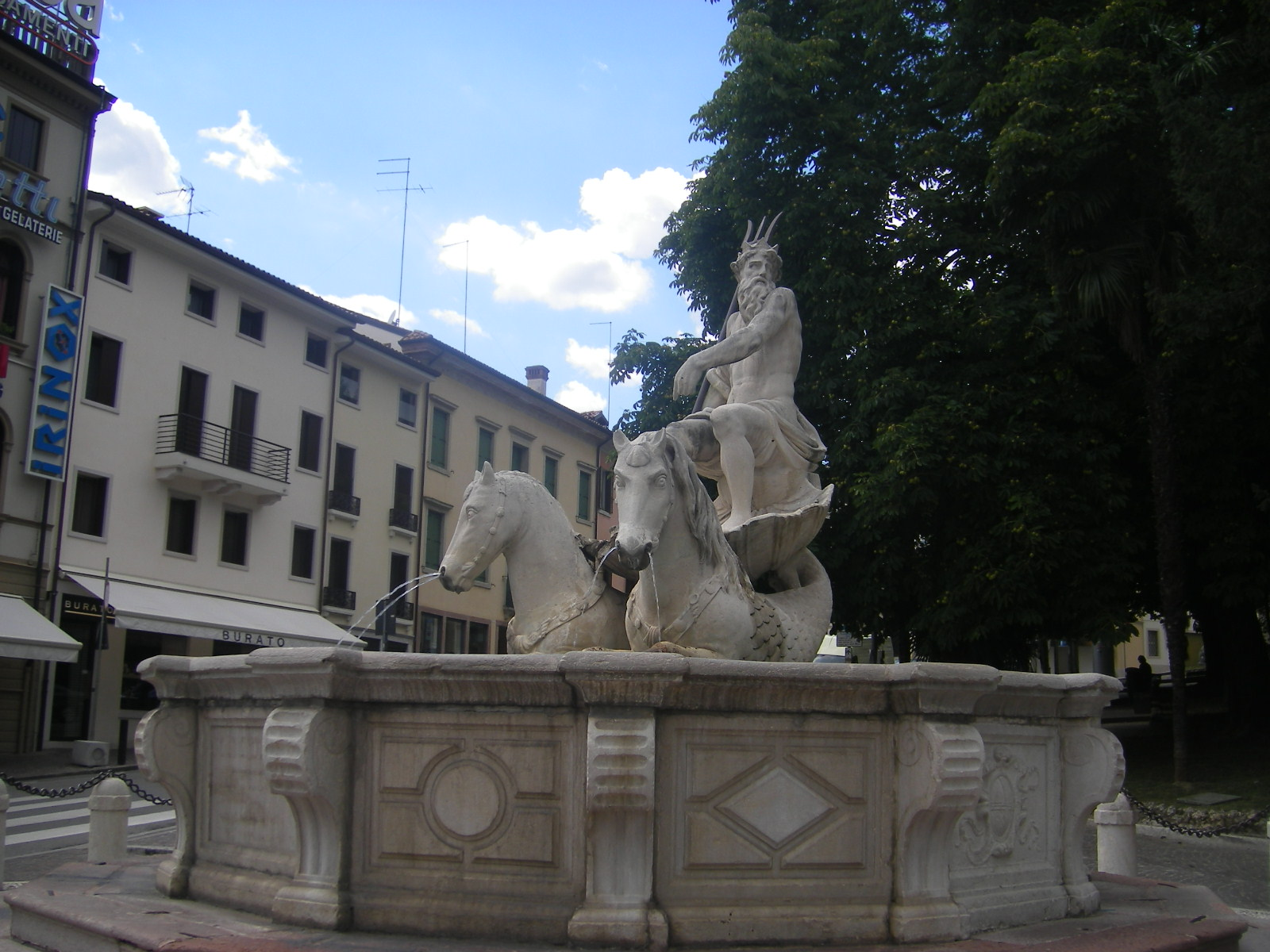
Fontana dei cavalli (Horses fountain)

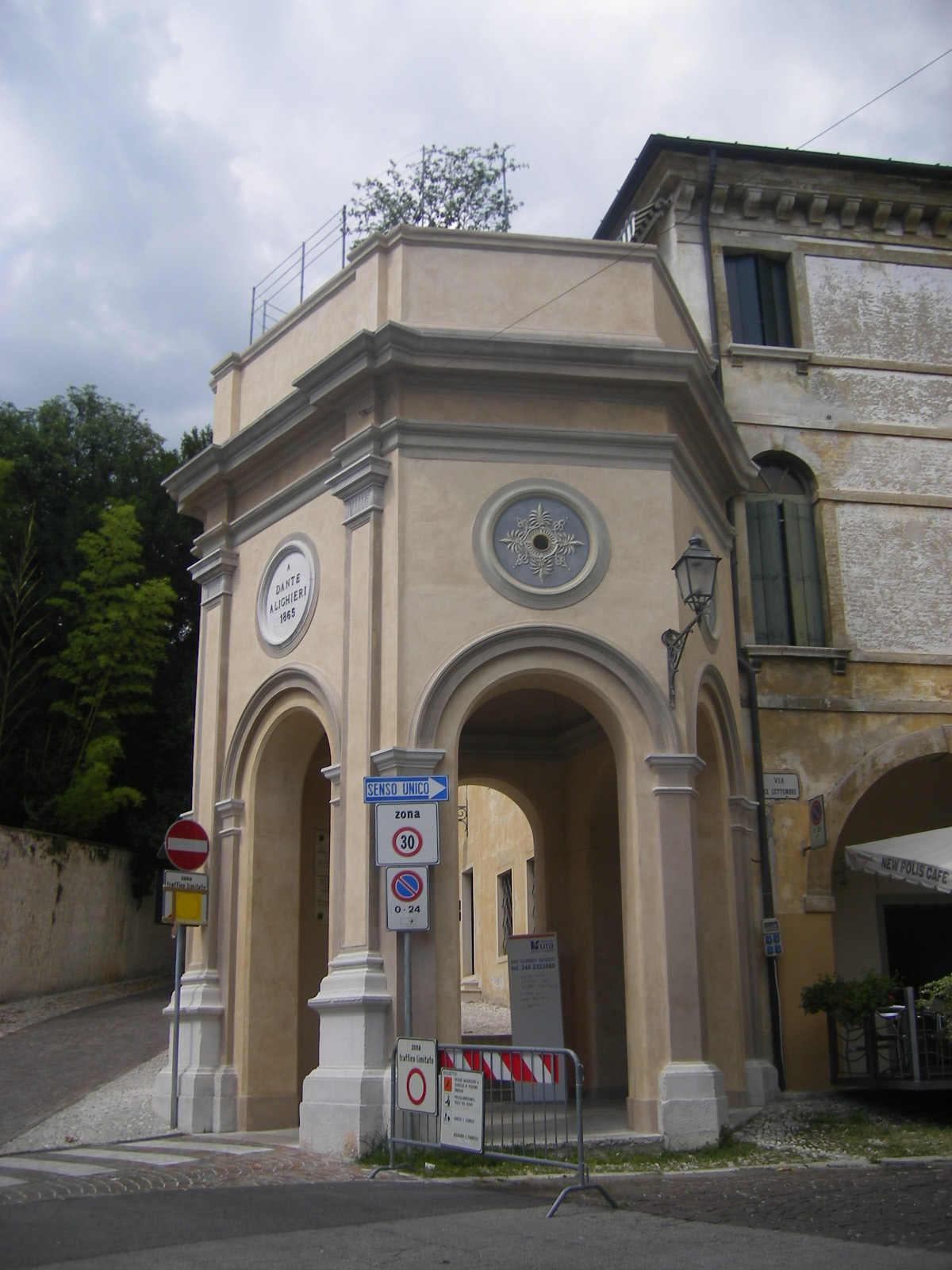
Porta Dante

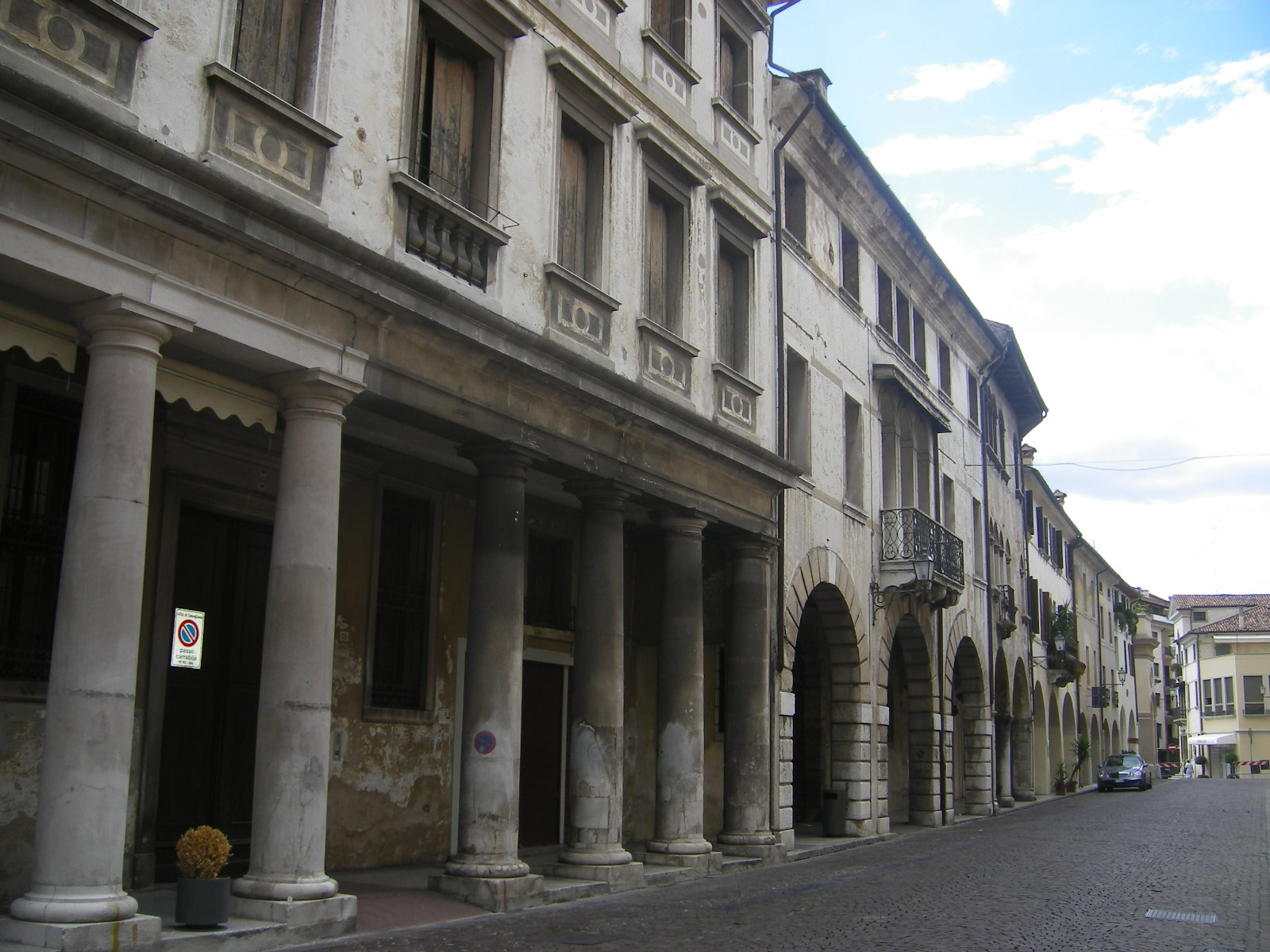
Via XX Settembre

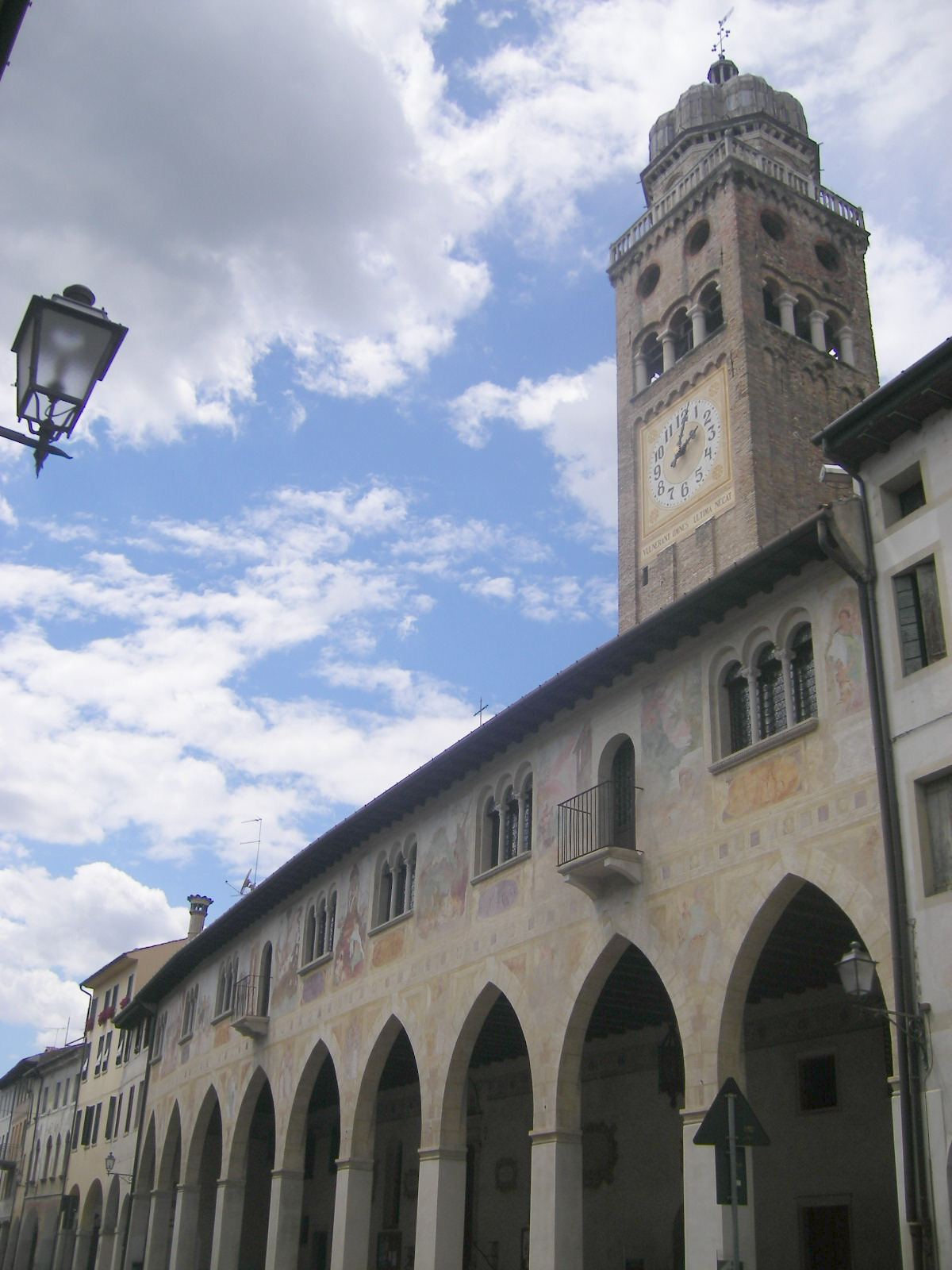
Duomo

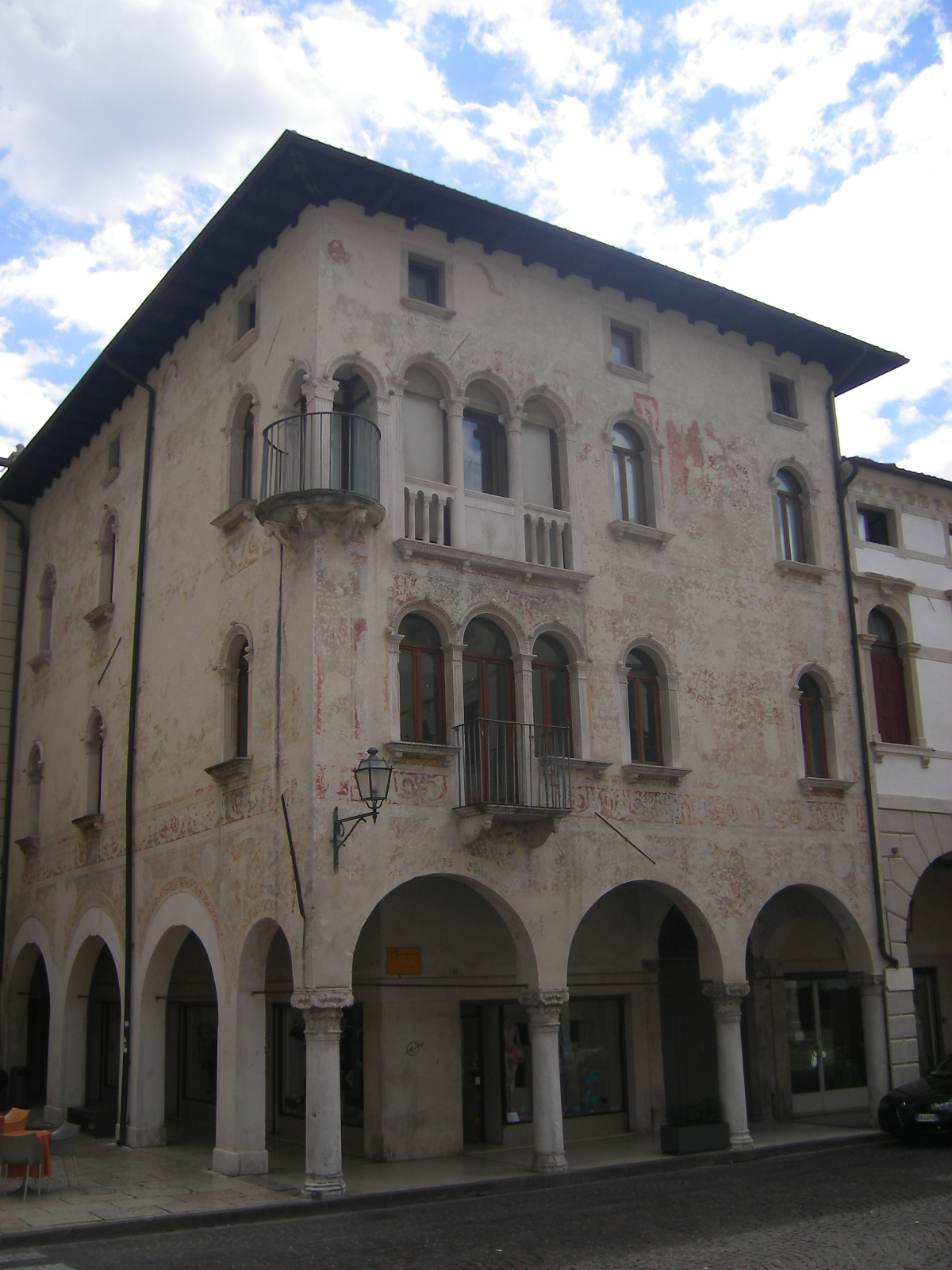
An old building in Via XX Settembre

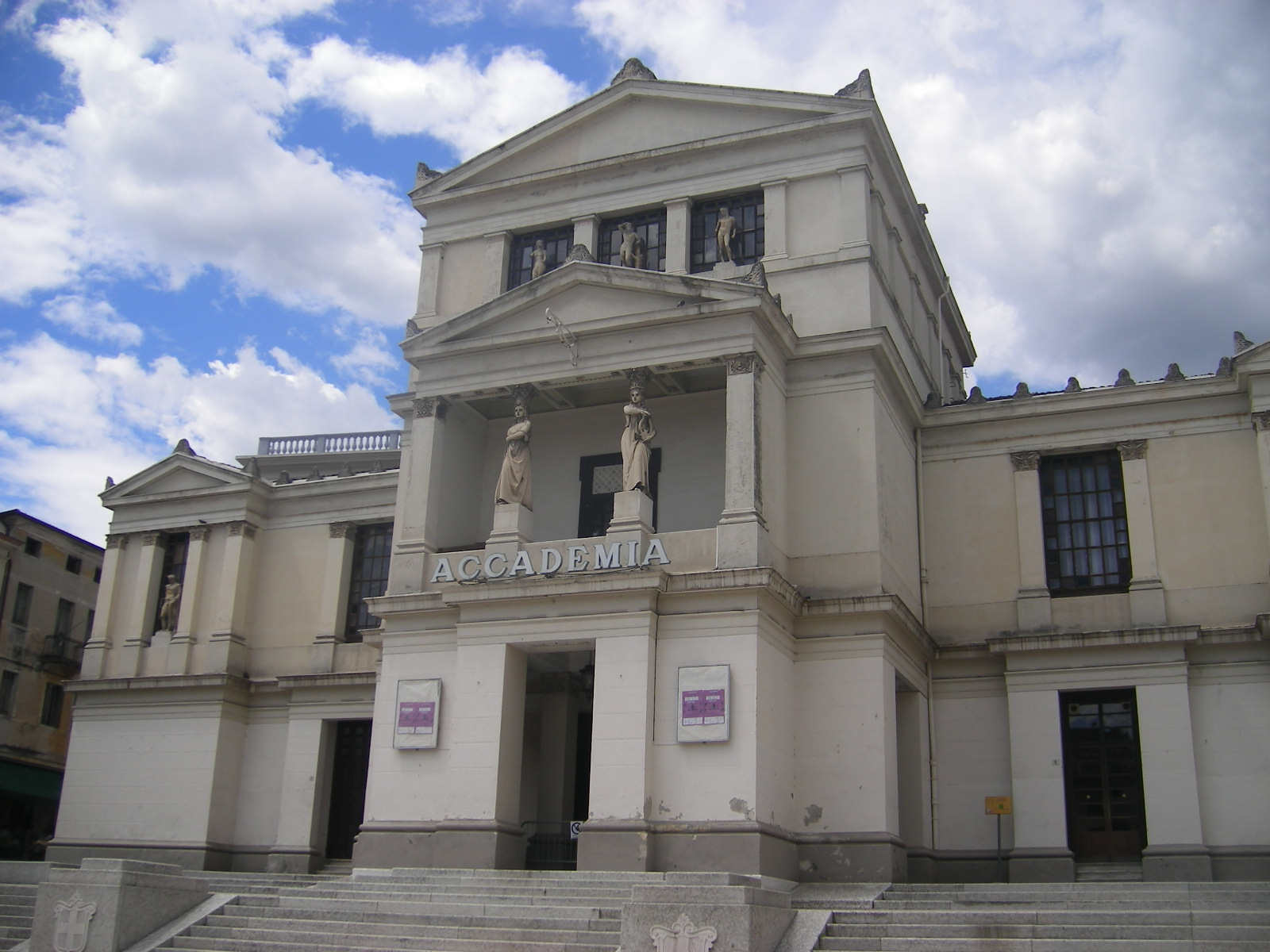
Cima Square, Accademia theatre

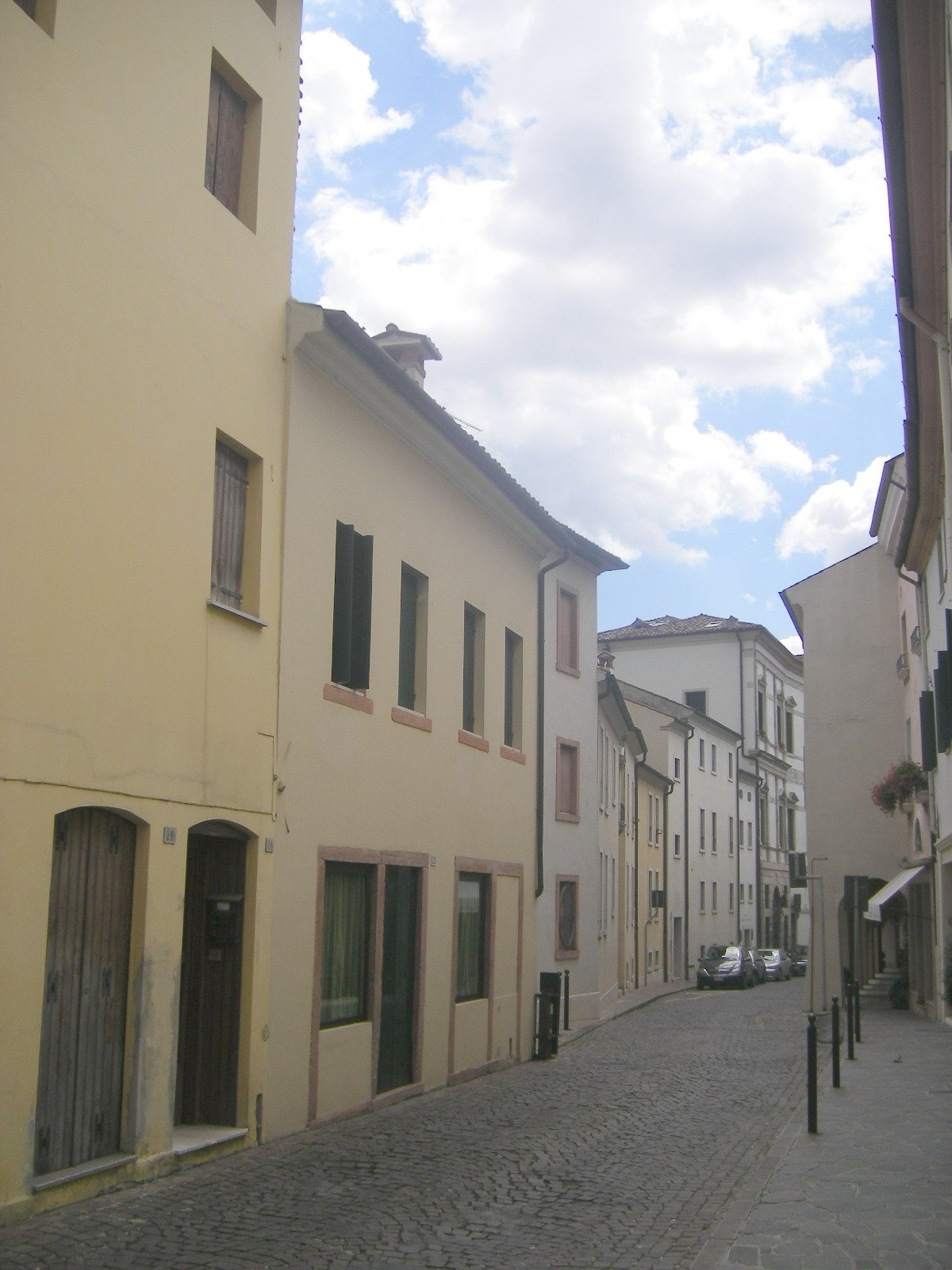
Via XX Settembre (with Montalban Palace)

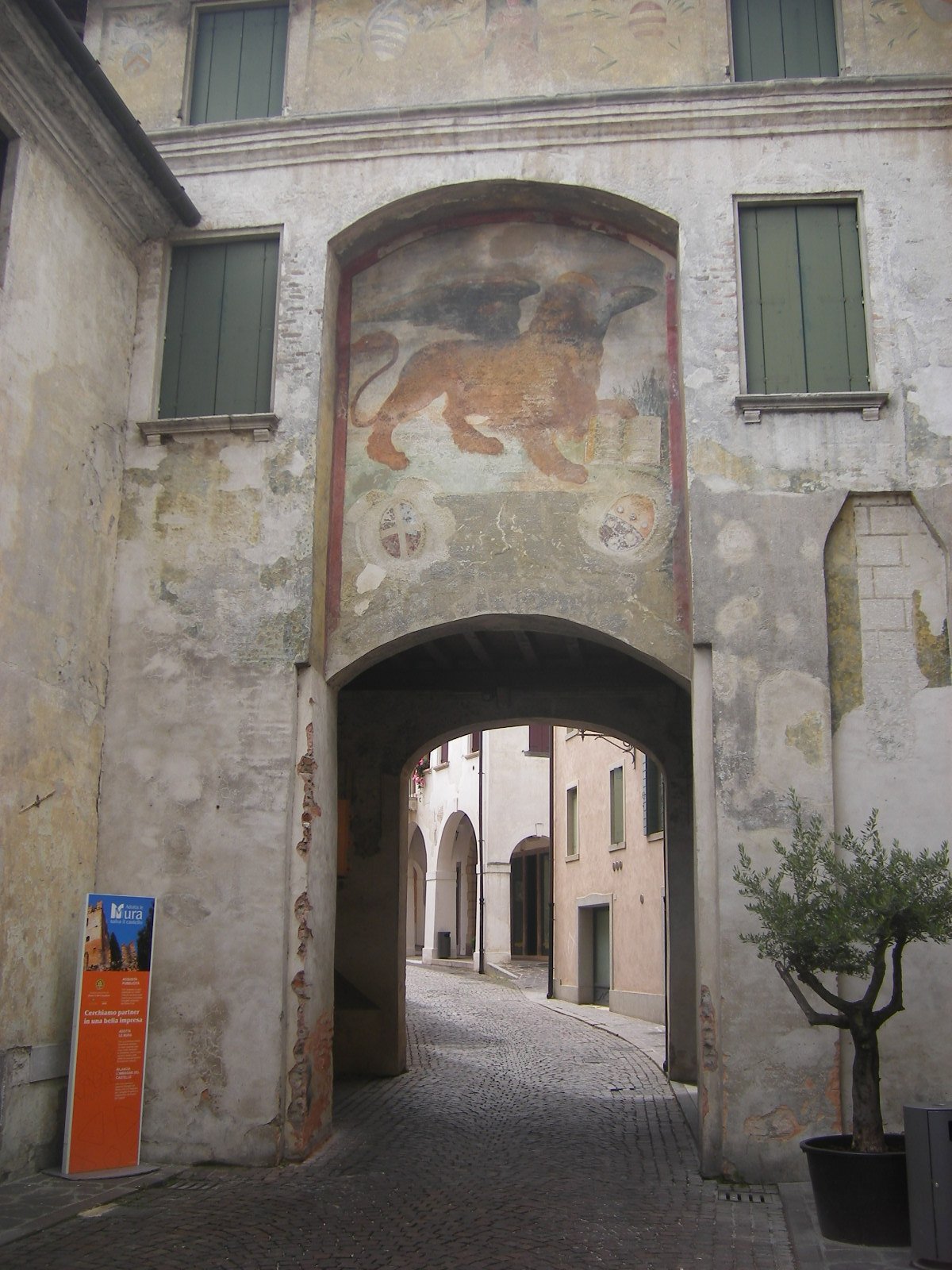
Porta Monticano

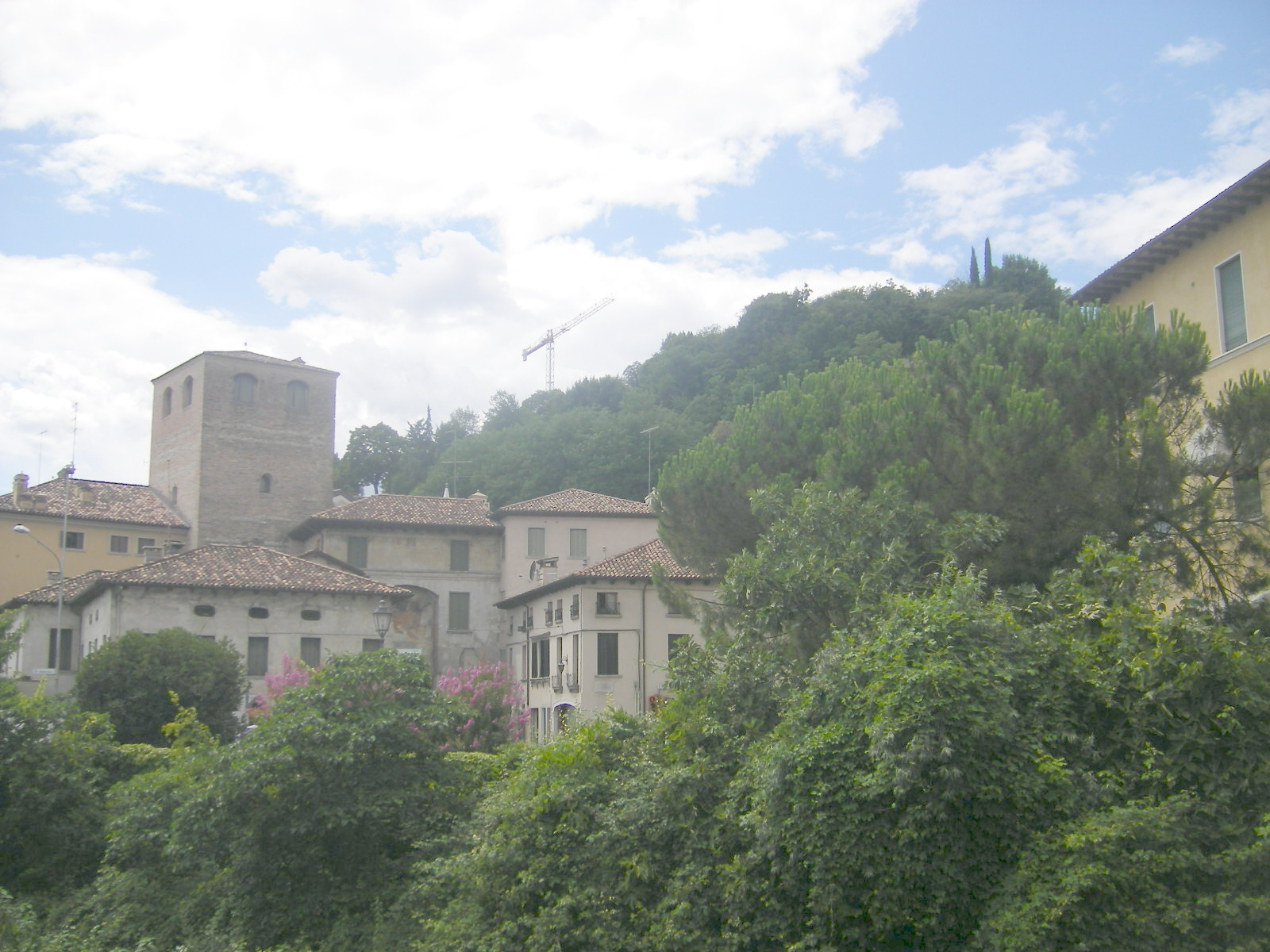
Porta Monticano

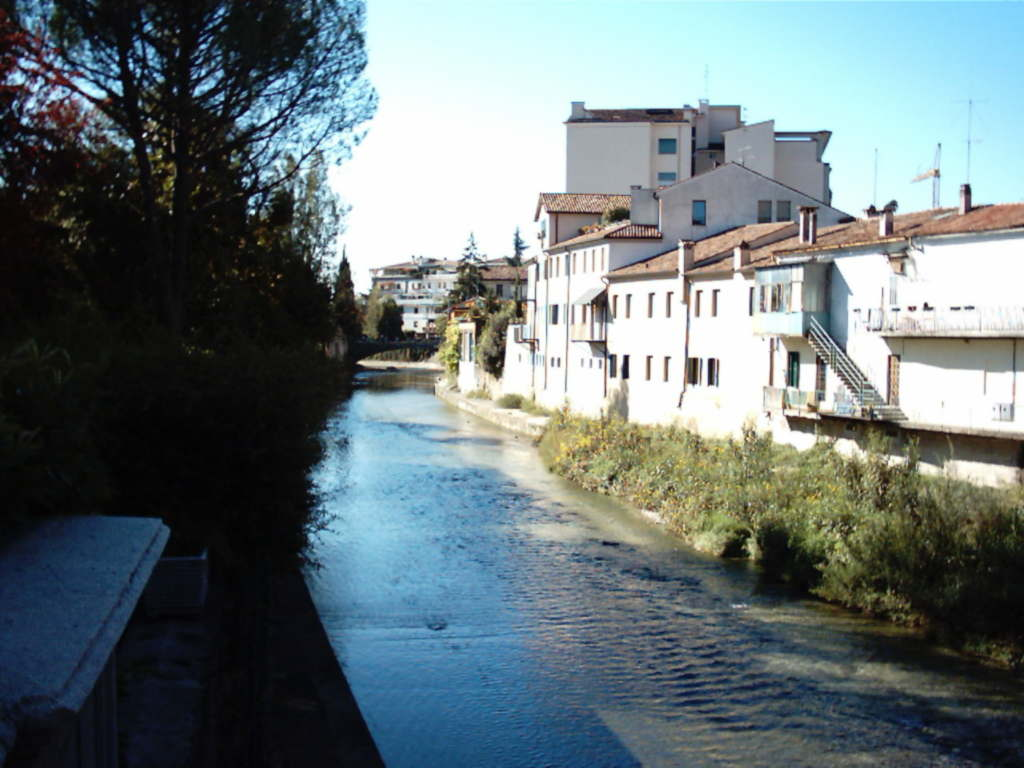
The river: Monticano

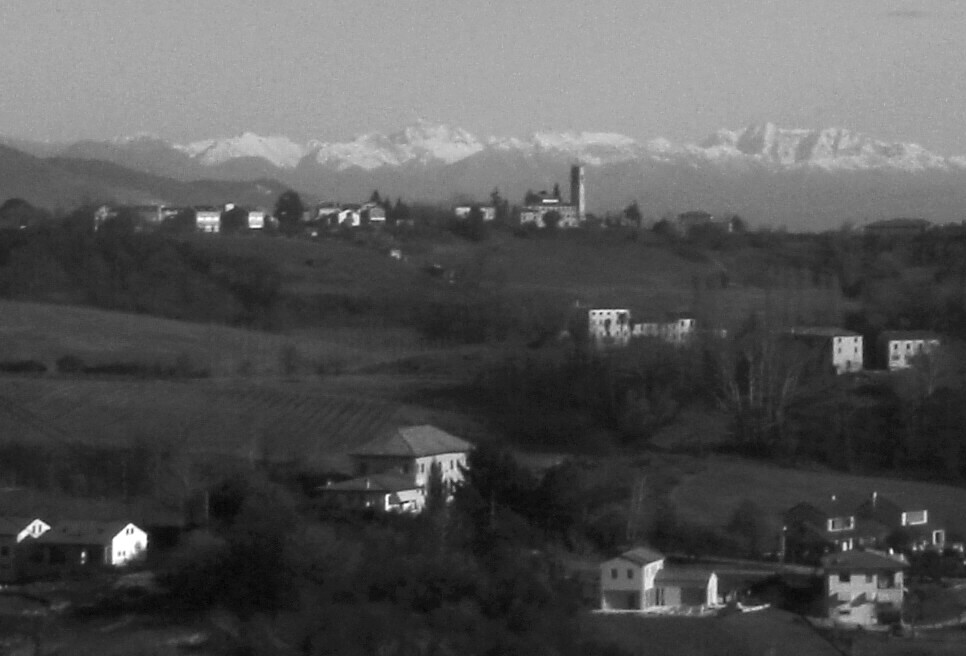
Prosecco hills of Conegliano (in località Costa)

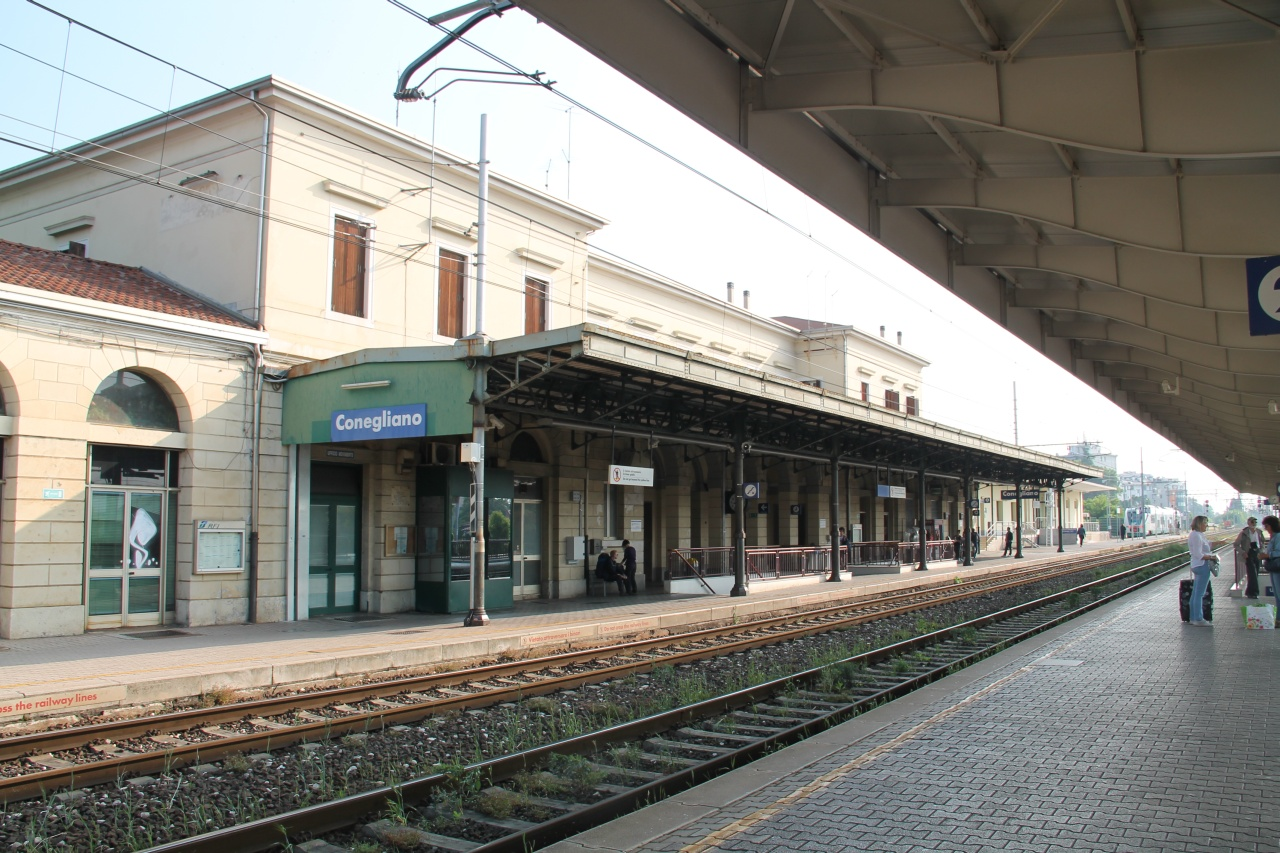
Train station
