= Valentino nero =

Variety of grape

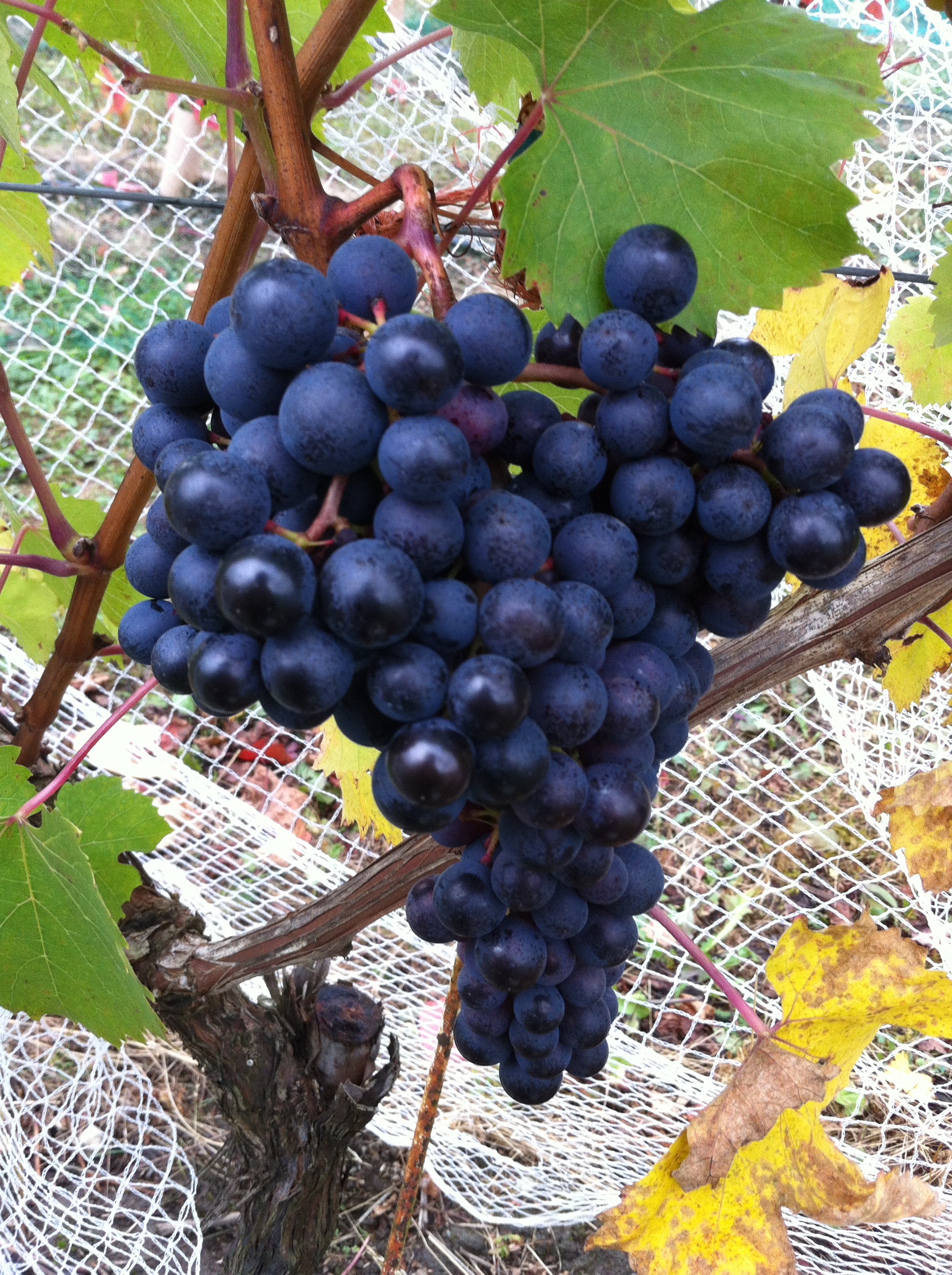
Dolcetto, one of the parent vines of Valentino nero

Valentino nero is a red Italian wine grape variety that is grown in the Piedmont wine region of northwest Italy but was initially bred at the Conegliano research center in the Veneto. In 1936, its creator, Giovanni Dalmasso, stated that the grape was a crossing of two Vitis vinifera Piedmontese varieties, Nebbiolo and Dolcetto, but DNA profiling in 2009 showed that the French wine grape Chatus and Dolcetto were the parent vines.

== History and relationship to other grapes ==
Valentino nero was created by the Italian grape breeder Giovanni Dalmasso at the Conegliano research center in the Veneto region in 1936. When Dalmasso released the variety, he claimed that it was a crossing of Nebbiolo (a grape notable for its use in Barolo and Barbaresco) and Dolcetto (another Piedmontese variety). The grape was officially approved for the use in Italian wine production in 1977.

In the early 21st century, DNA analysis showed that the "Nebbiolo" used to sire Valentino was not the notable Nebbiolo grape of Barolo but rather an obscure French grape from the Ardèche region, Chatus, that is known as Nebbiolo di Dronero in the Piedmont region. While Dolcetto was still confirmed to be one of the parent varieties, Valentino nero's parentage of Chatus x Dolcetto makes it a full sibling to the Veneto wine grape Passau and San Martino.

== Wine regions ==
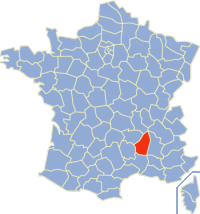
The Ardèche region in France where Valentino nero's other parent variety, Chatus, originated

While Valentino nero was first created in the Vento region, today it is almost exclusively found in the Piedmont region with very limited plantings.

== Synonyms ==
Over the years, Valentino nero has been known under a variety of synonyms including Dalmasso 16-8, Incrocio Dalmasso 16/8, Incrocio Dalmasso XVI/8 and Valentino.
