= Francesco Beccaruzzi =

Italian painter

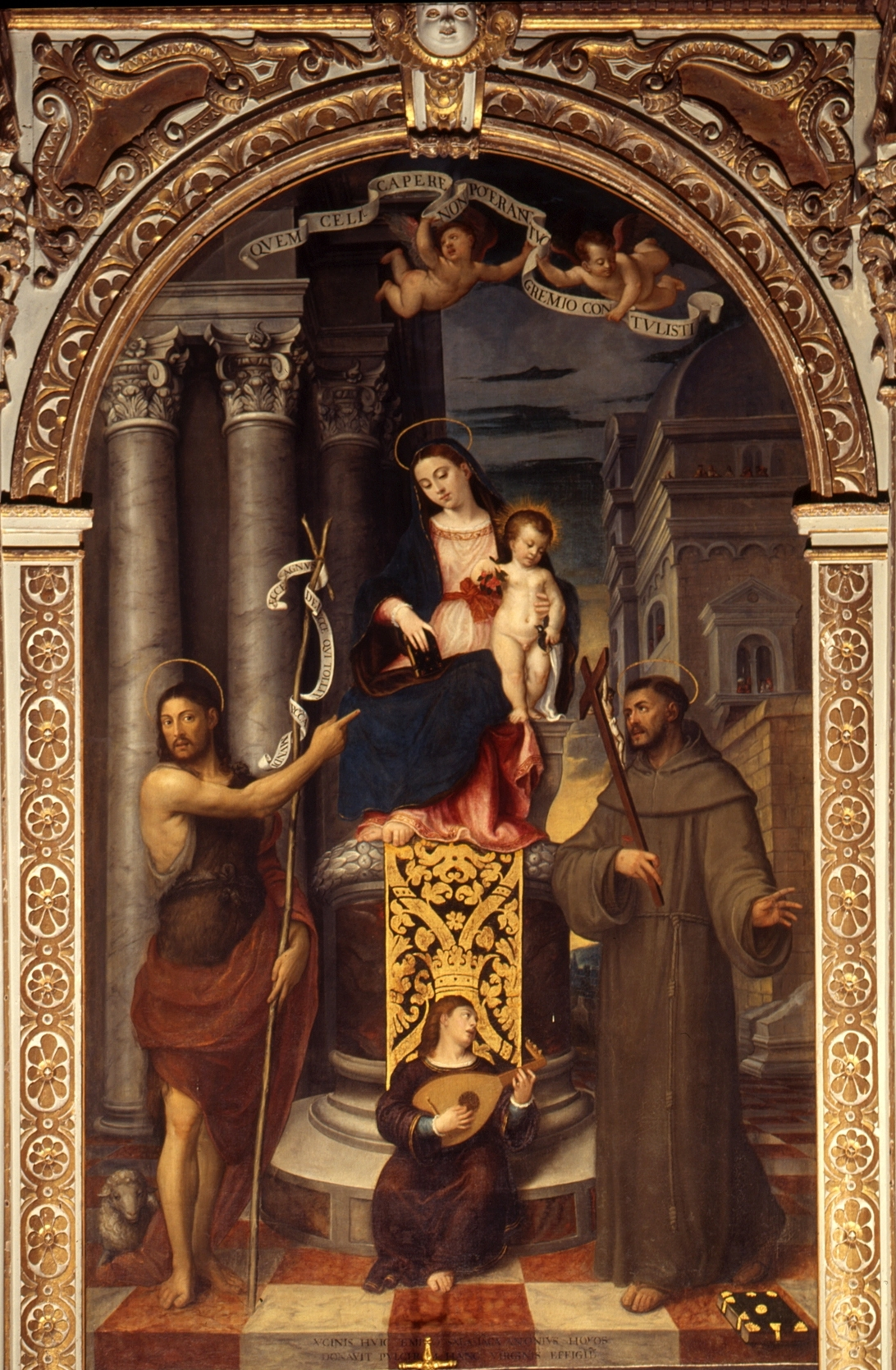
Francesco Beccaruzzi, Virgin Enthroned between the St. John the Baptist and St. Francesco

Francesco Beccaruzzi (c. 1492–1562) was an Italian painter of the Renaissance era, active near his hometown of Conegliano and in the neighborhood of Treviso. He was influenced by both Il Pordenone and later Titian. He painted Saint Francis receiving stigmata (1545) from Conegliano, but now in the Gallerie dell'Accademia in Venice.

== Works ==
- St Mark with Saints Leonard and Catherine of Alexandria, altarpiece in Duomo of Conegliano
- St Francis receives stigmata, with saints, altarpiece in the Duomo of Conegliano
- Resurrection, fresco in parrocchial church of Campolongo (Conegliano)
- Saints Peter, Paul, Sebastian, Roch, Catherine of Alexandria, and John, with Saints Giustina and Catherine of Alexandria, altarpiece in the church of Santa Giustina di San Fior di Sotto
- Madonna col Bambino enthroned with Saints John the Baptist and Francis Church of Santa Maria delle Grazie, Conegliano
- Meeting of Gioacchino and Anne, Duomo of Castelfranco Veneto
- Saints Peter, Paul, Sebastian, Roch, Catherine of Alexandria, and John the Baptist in trono tra sant'Elena and St Titian, (1545), Parochial Church of San Elena in Scomigo
- Madonna and child with Saints Peter, Paul, Sebastian, Roch, Catherine of Alexandria, and John the Baptist (1540), Parrocchial Church of Mareno di Piave
