= Alberto Rapisarda =

Alberto Rapisarda (born 1964 in Conegliano) is an Italian comics and multimedia artist who started writing and drawing comics in the mid-1980s for the Rome based Frigidaire Magazine. Since 1983, he has also collaborated with Zio Feininger, a comics school and cultural association which was founded in Bologna by Andrea Pazienza, Lorenzo Mattotti and others, and has the goal of promoting Italian cartoonists through exposition and live performance.
