= Conegliano Altarpiece =

15th-century Italian altarpiece painting

Madonna and Child with Angels and Saints
- Madonna in trono col Bambino fra angeli e santi (Italian)
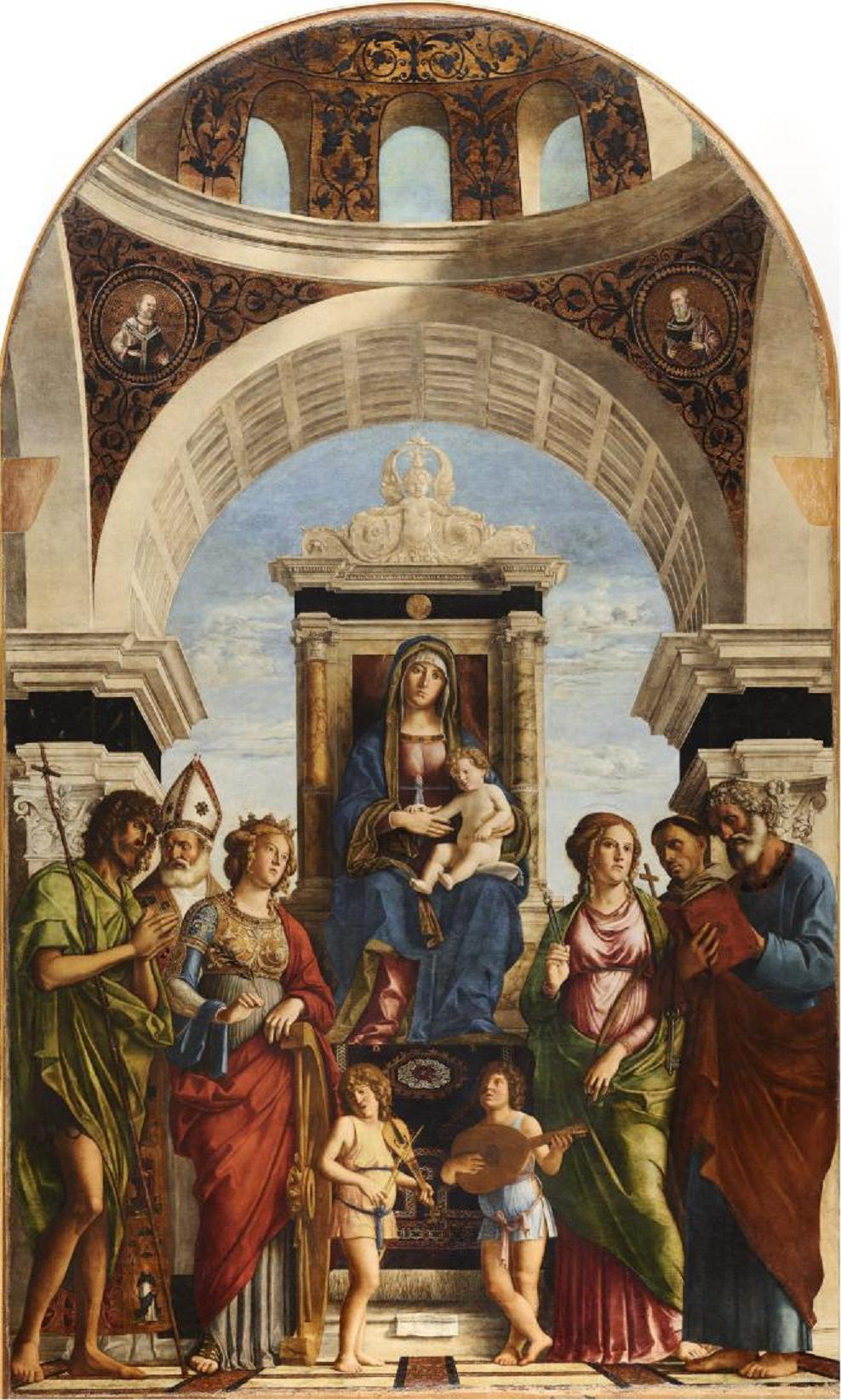
- Artist: Cima da Conegliano
- Year: 1492
- Medium: Oil on wood
- Dimensions: 235 cm × 150 cm (93 in × 59 in)
- Location: Duomo of Conegliano

The Conegliano Altarpiece or Madonna and Child with Angels and Saints is an oil painting produced in 1492 by Cima da Conegliano as the high altarpiece for the Duomo di Conegliano in his birthplace.

== History ==
The painting was commissioned in the 1490s by Francesco Codroipo and Giovanni della Pasqualina. At that time, Cima was active in Venice under the influence of Giovanni Bellini.

In the 20th century, the painting was transferred onto canvas using a thermal roller, due to the precarious condition of its original wooden panel. In 2009, the painting was conserved again by the workshop of Renza Clochiatti Garla.

== Description ==
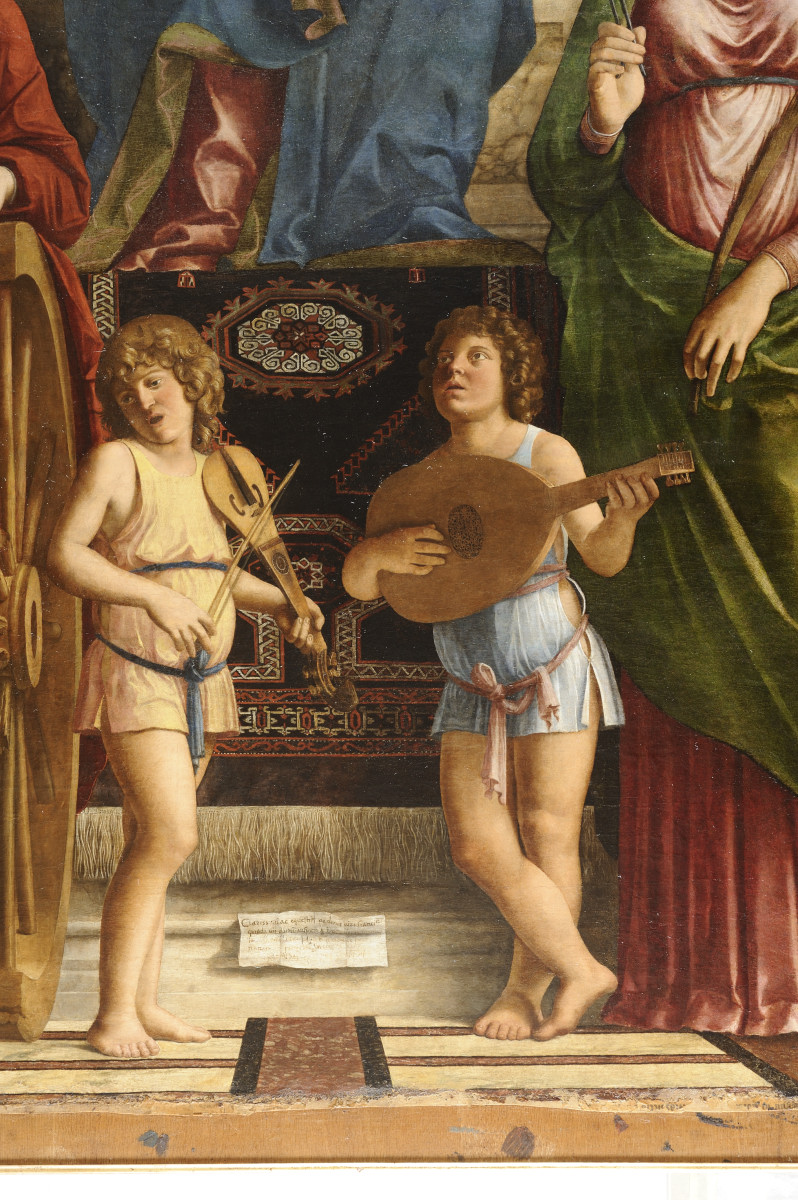
Detail of the two musicians

The painting represents the Virgin Mary enthroned at center, with the Baby Jesus on her lap. On the left are Saint John the Baptist and Saint Catherine of Alexandria. On the right are Saint Apollonia, Saint Francis of Assisi, and Saint Peter with an open book. The figures are identified by their traditional attributes. For example, Mary is dressed in red and blue; and Saint Catherine wears a crown and holds the instrument of her martyrdom, a wheel.

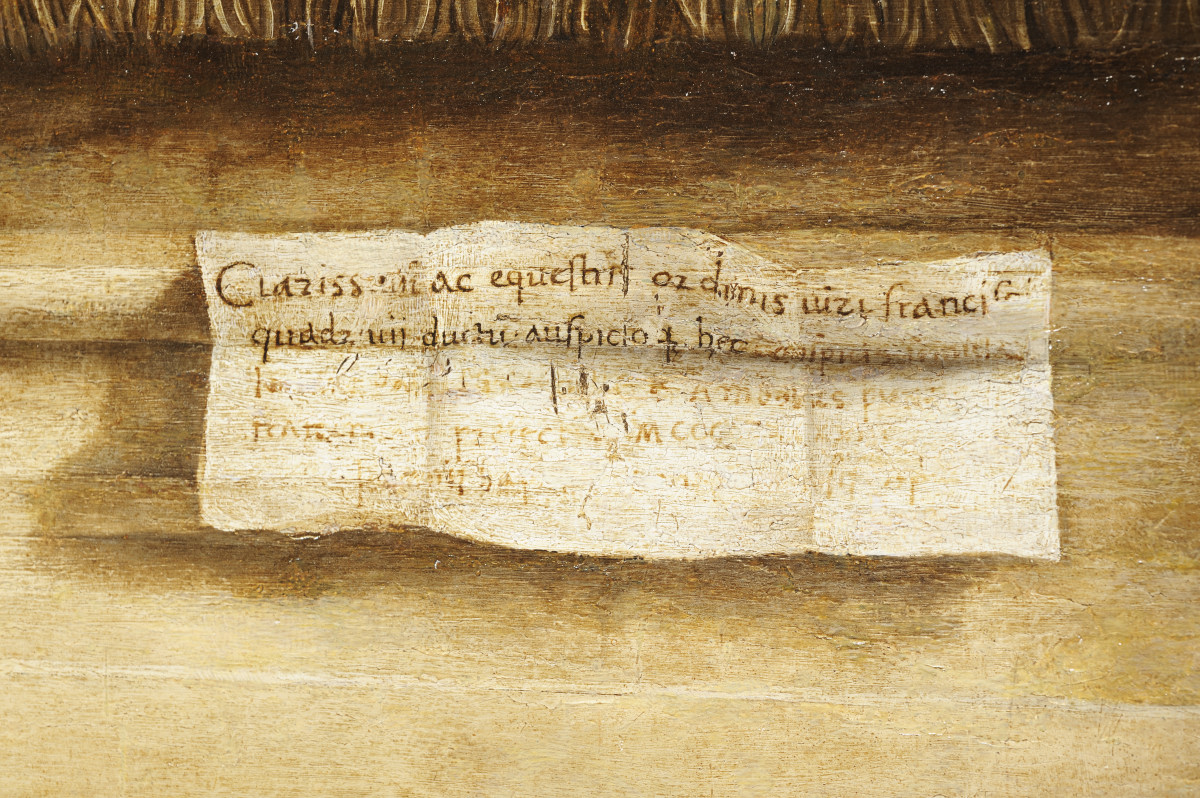
Detail of the altarpiece's trompe-l'œil inscription

The architectural background uses classical forms. The two saints on each side seem to support the architectural structure over them. At the foot of the throne, two musicians add movement to the Sacra conversazione composition. Above the throne, the coffered vault opens out onto a blue sky with little white clouds, adding light to the painting. Pendentives on the dome in the background show John the Evangelist and Venice's patron saint Mark the Evangelist.
