= Colla Rossa =

Alpine pass between Italy and France

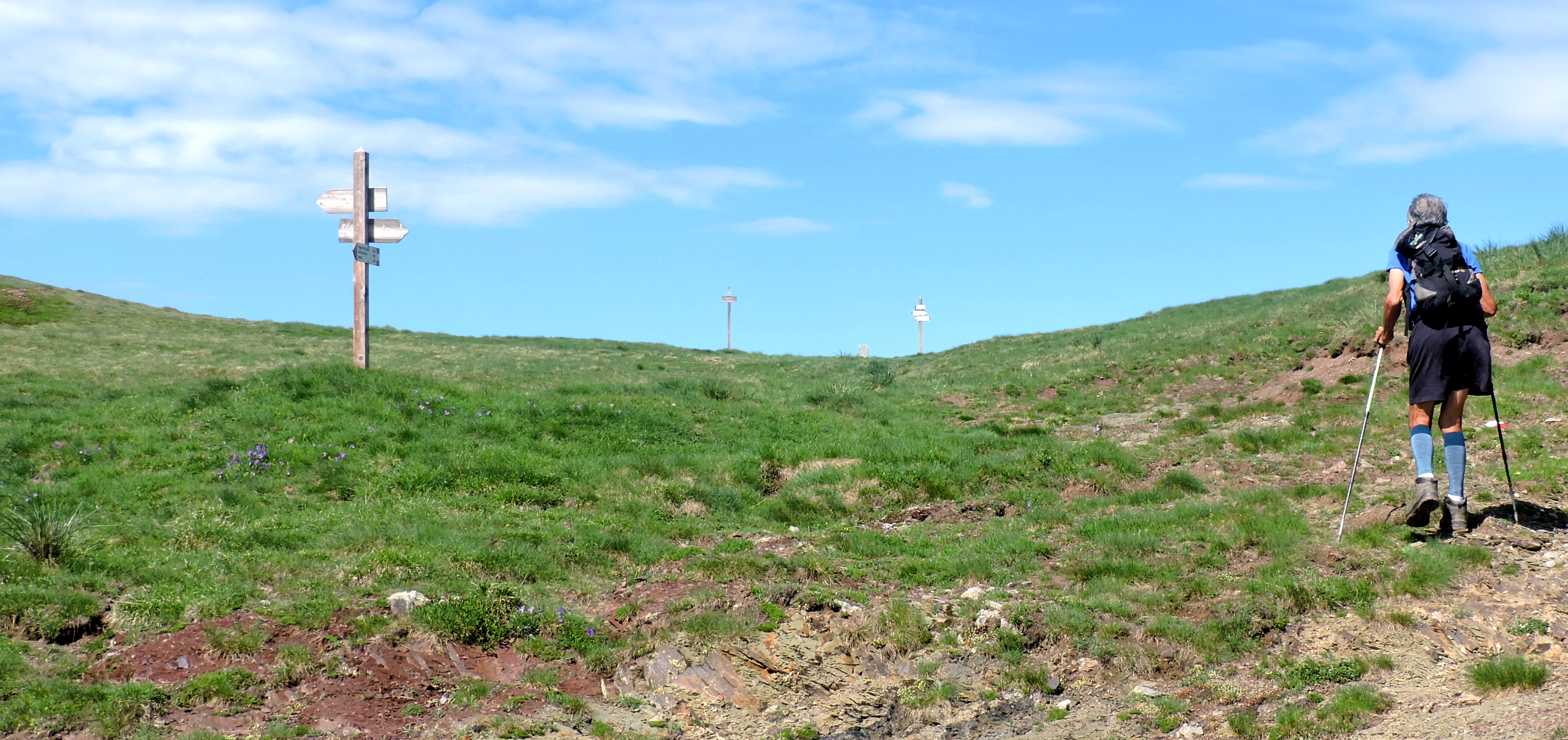
- The Italian side of the pass

- Location within Alps
- Elevation: 2,172 metres (7,126 ft)
- Traversed by: former military dirt road

Third Approach
- Location: Piedmont, Italy; Provence-Alpes-Côte d'Azur, France
- Range: Ligurian Alps
- Coordinates: 44°06′46″N 7°41′02″E

Colla Rossa (both on Italian and on the French maps) at 2,172 m is a mountain pass in the Ligurian Alps. It connects the valleys of Roya in France and Tanaro in Italy.

== Etymology ==
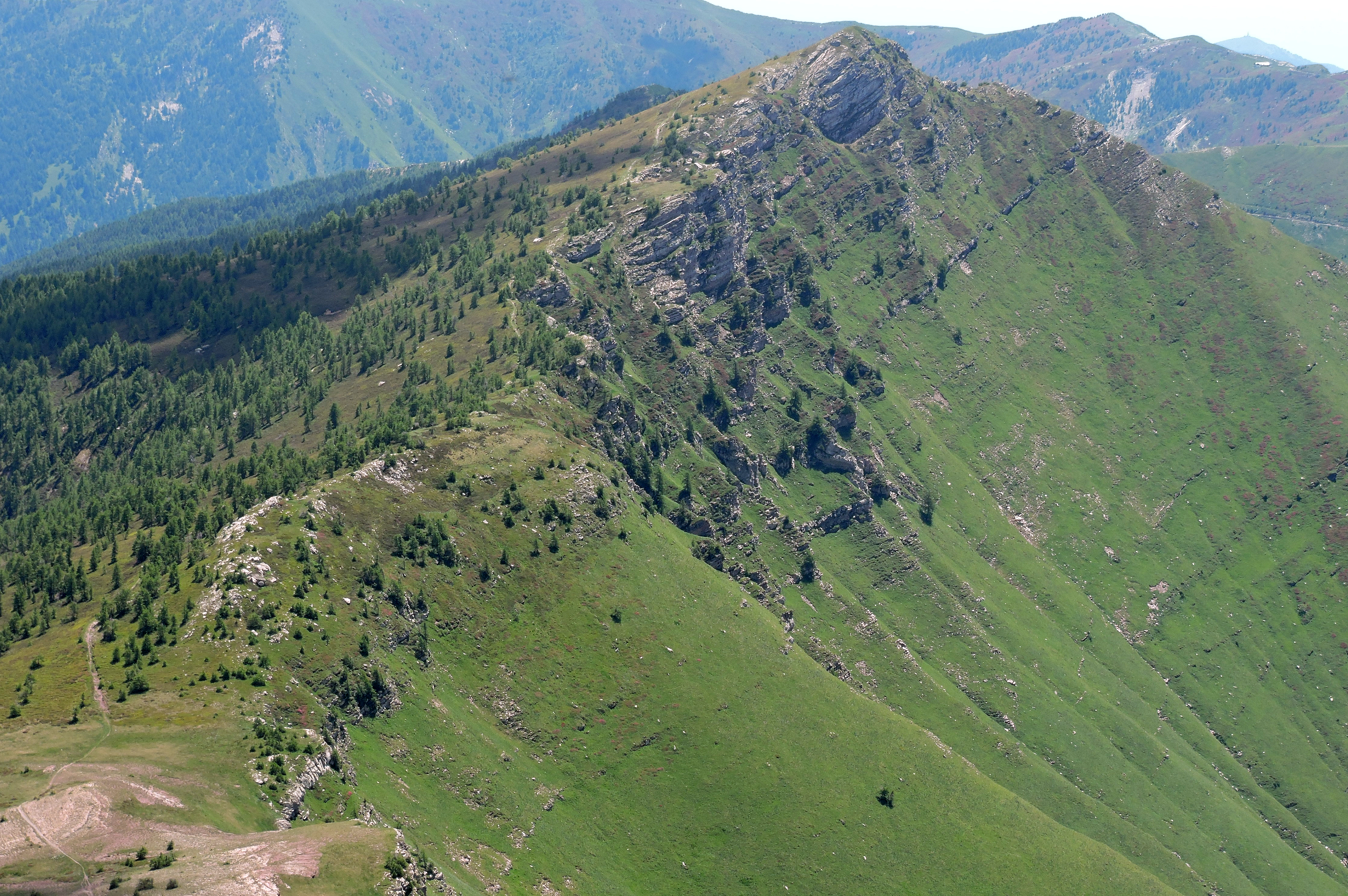
Colloa Rossa as seen from Monte Bertrand, on the right the Cime de Missun

The name Colla, which in Italian also means glue, in Liguria also refers to a mountain pass. Rossa means red and comes from the reddish colour of the ground in the pass area.

== Geography ==
The pass stands between Monte Bertrand (NW) and Cime de Missun, and belongs to the Main chain of the Alps and to the water divide between the drainage basins of river Po (East) and Roya. Administratively is shared by the Italian comune of Briga Alta (CN) and the French mairie of La Brigue (FR-06).

== History ==
The pass up to World War II was totally belonging to Italy but, following the Paris Peace Treaties signed in February 1947, is now lies on the France–Italy border.

== Access ==
The Colla Rossa can be reached on foot, by mountain bike and in some month of the year also with off-road vehicles, from Colle delle Selle Vecchie or Passo Tanarello following the former military dirt road which connects Monesi with the Colle di Tenda.

== See also ==
- List of mountain passes
- France–Italy border
