= Cima di Pertegà =

Mountain in Italy

- Cime de la Pertègue
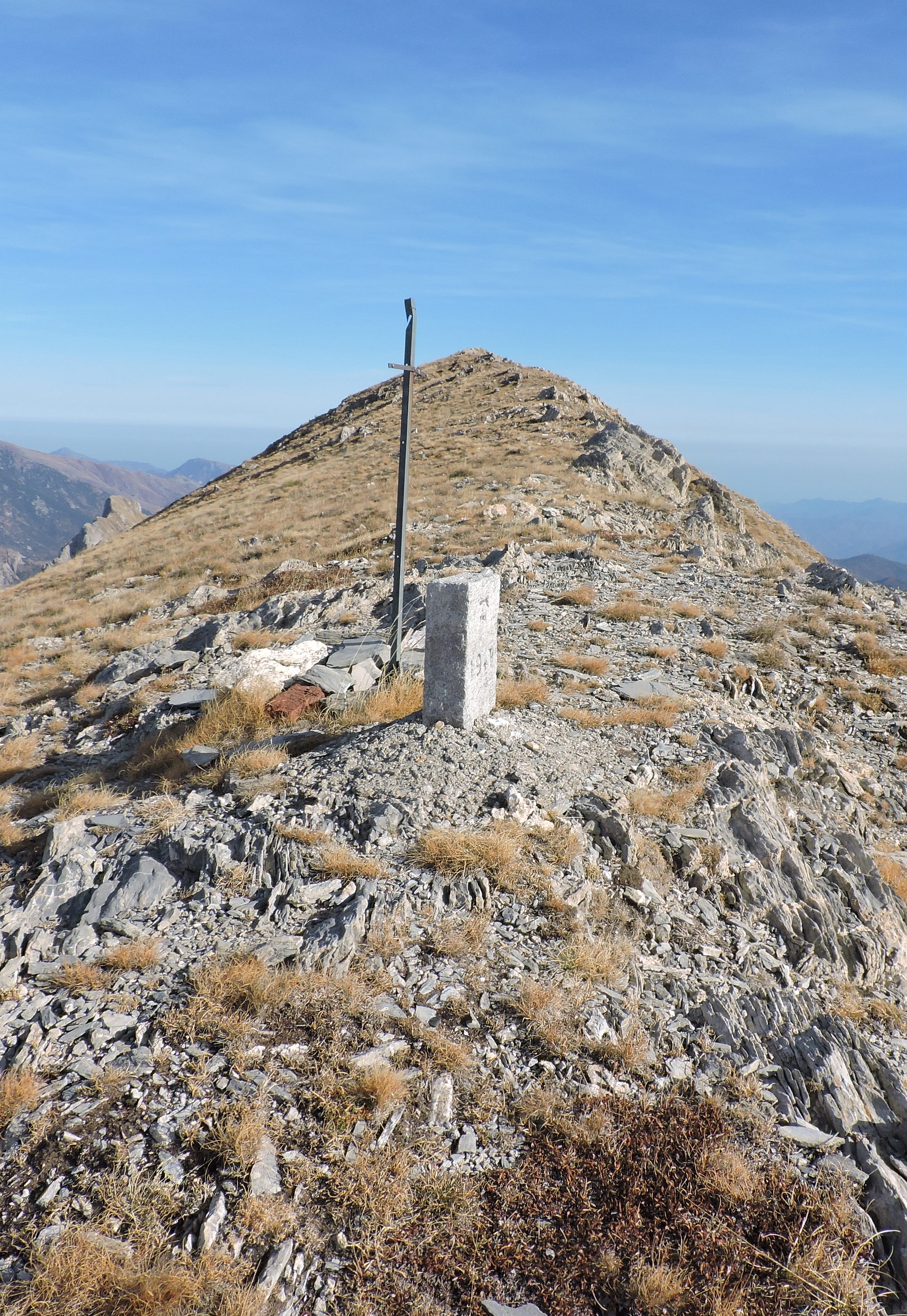

Highest point
- Elevation: 2,404 m (7,887 ft)
- Prominence: 297 m (974 ft)
- Coordinates: 44°08′50.39″N 7°40′45.19″E

Geography
- Location within Alps
- Location: Piemonte, Italy - Provence-Alpes-Côte d'Azur, France
- Parent range: Ligurian Alps

Climbing
- First ascent: ancestral
- Easiest route: step meadows

Cima di Pertegà (Italian) or Cime de la Pertègue (French) is a mountain located on the French-Italian border between Piemonte and Provence-Alpes-Côte d'Azur.

== History ==
Until World War II, the mountain belonged wholly to Italy. Since the Paris Peace Treaties, signed in February 1947, however, it is shared by Italy and France. In former times it was known as Cima Varcona or Cima Valcona.

== Geography ==
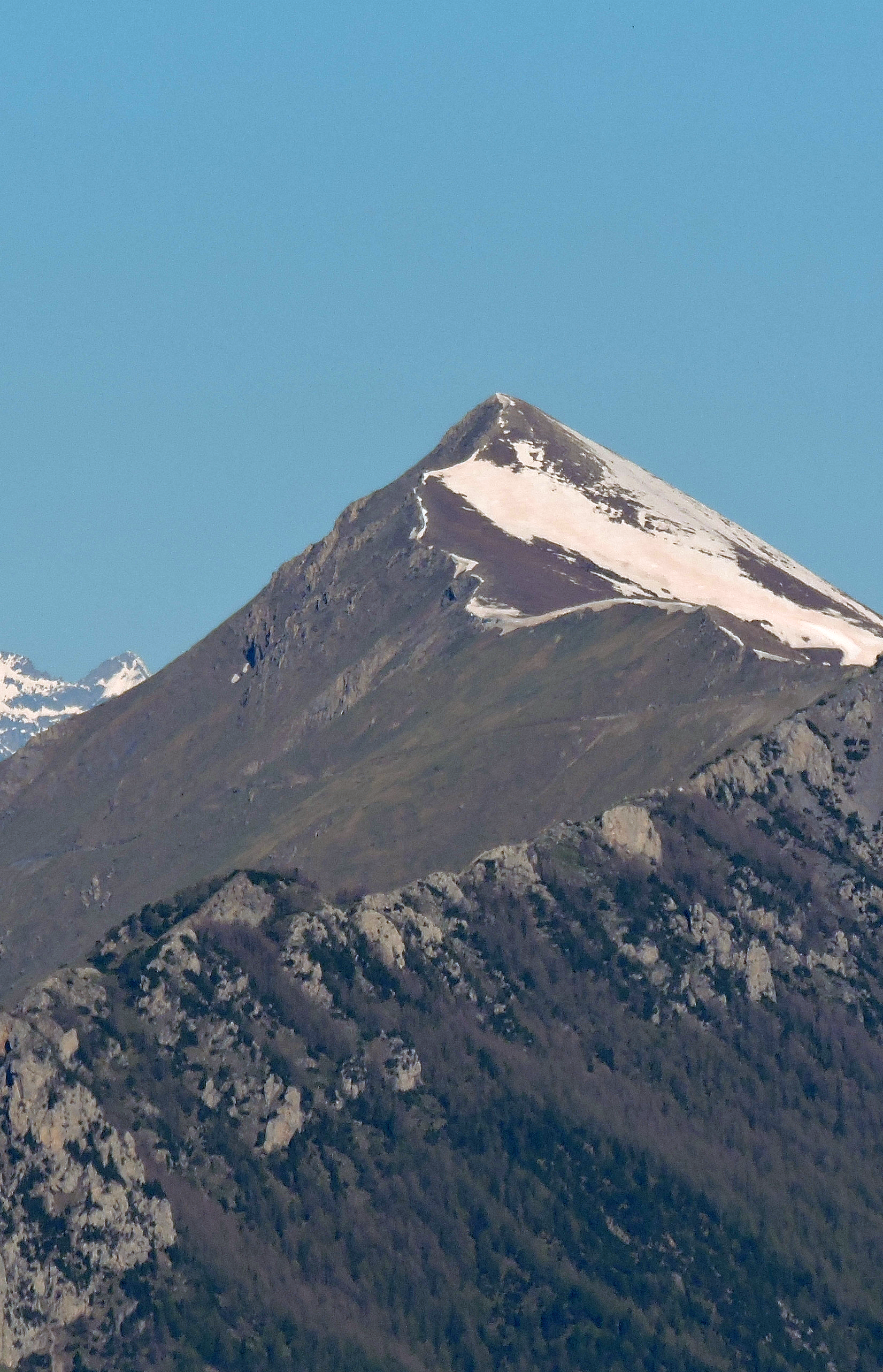
View in June from the Monte della Guardia.

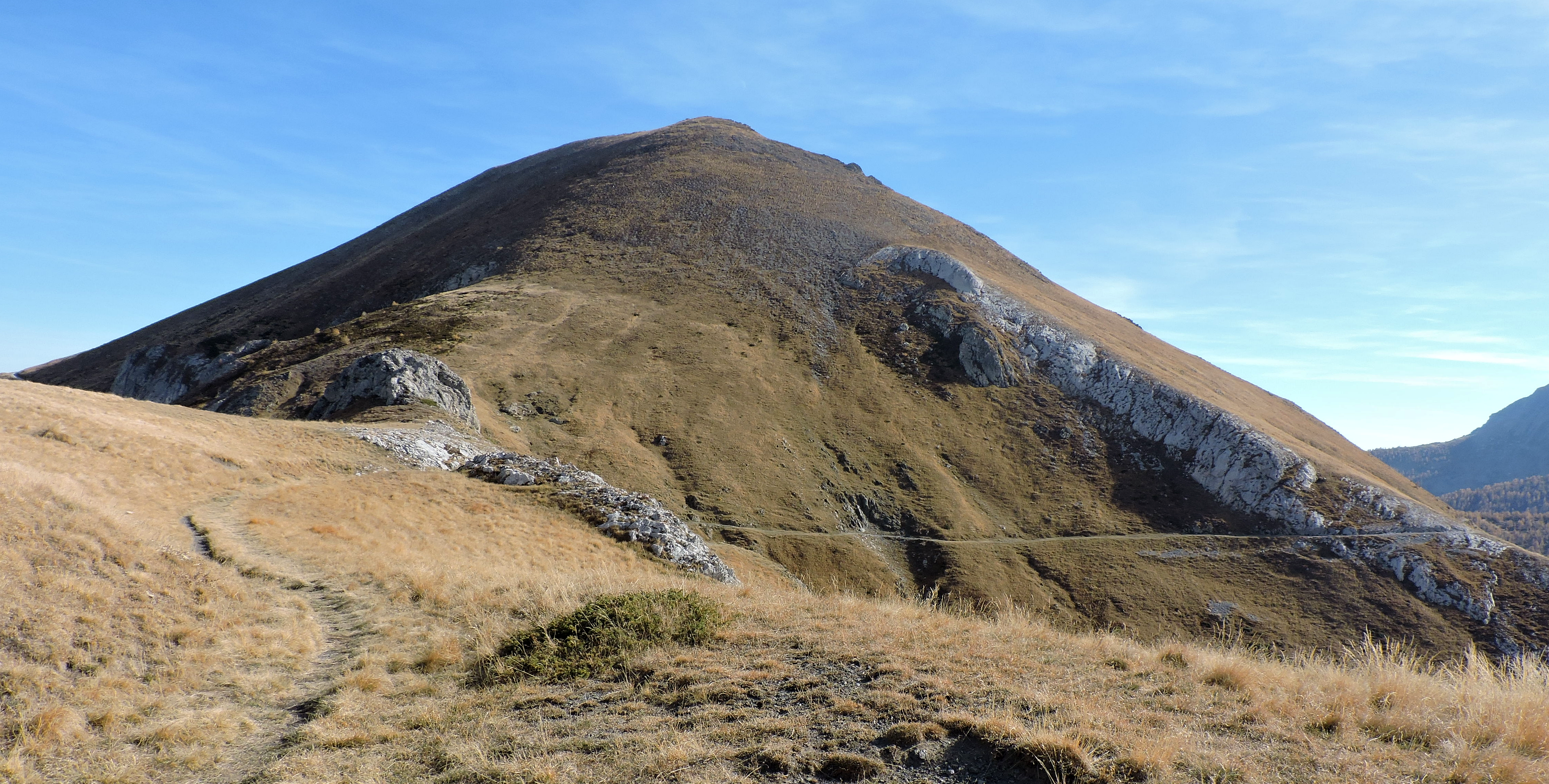
Northern view

The mountain belongs to the Ligurian Alps and is located on the main chain of the Alps. On its top three ridges meet: on the northern one a saddle at 2.207 m, sometimes named Colle di Capoves, divides the Cima di Pertegà from the Cime de Capoves (2.260 m). Going east a mountain ridge starts from Cima di Pertegà dividing Carnino valley (a north) from the central part of the Tanarello valley, while going South the Cima di Pertegà is divided by the nearby Cime de l'Eveque and Monte Bertrand by the steep saddle of the colle delle Selle Vecchie. On the Italian side of the mountain runs a former-military dirt road connecting Monesi (a village of the municipality of Triora) with the colle di Tenda. The summit of the Cima di Pertegà is marked by a boundary marker, and close to it is located a small summit cross.

=== SOIUSA classification ===
According to the SOIUSA (International Standardized Mountain Subdivision of the Alps) the mountain can be classified in the following way:

- main part = Western Alps
- major sector = South Western Alps
- section = Ligurian Alps
- subsection = (It:Alpi del Marguareis/Fr:Alpes Liguriennes Occidentales)
- supergroup = (It:Catena Marguareis-Mongioie/Fr:Chaîne Marguareis-Mongioie)
- group = (It:Gruppo del Marguareis/Fr:Groupe du Marguareis)
- subgroup = (It:Nodo del Marguareis/Fr:Nœud du Marguareis)
- code = I/A-1.II-B.2.a

== Environment ==
The mountain is made of steep but regular and grassy slopes. Its NE slopes are included in the Parco naturale del Marguareis.

== Hiking ==
The mountain is accessible by walking tracks on steep meadows starting from the Colle dei Signori (North of the summit), Colle delle Selle Vecchie (South) or Passo di Framargal (East). The summit is also a well known winter hike, mainly for ski mountaineers.

== Mountain huts ==
- Rifugio Don Barbera

== Maps ==
- Cartografia ufficiale italiana in scala 1:25.000 e 1:100.000 (Map). Istituto Geografico Militare.
- Géoportail (French official maps) (Map). Institut géographique national.
- Carta in scala 1:50.000 n. 8 Alpi Marittime e Liguri (Map). Torino: Istituto Geografico Centrale.

== See also ==
- France–Italy border
