= Cima delle Saline =

Mountain in Italy

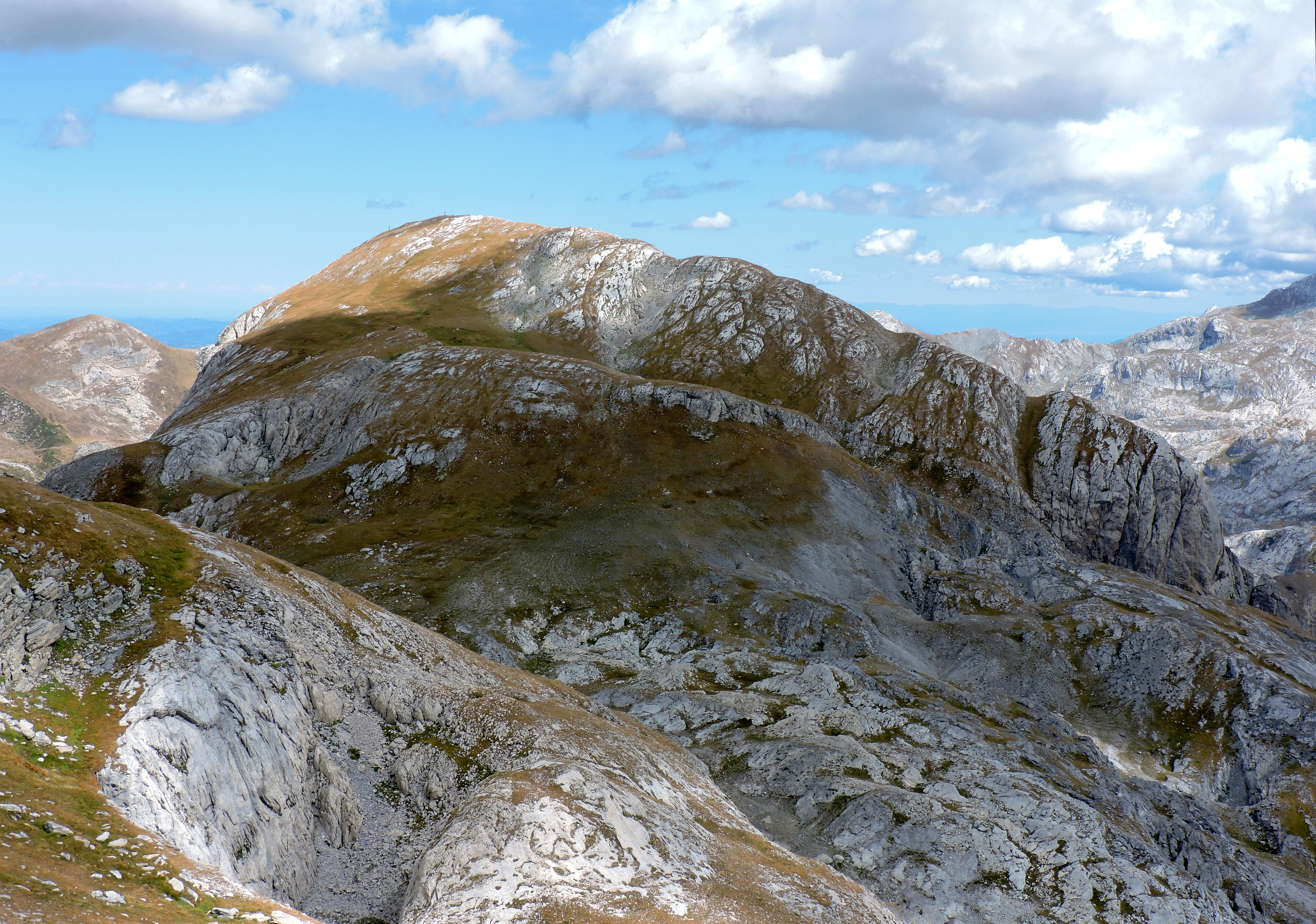
- View of the mountain from Pian Ballaur (West)

Highest point
- Elevation: 2,612 m (8,570 ft)
- Prominence: 270 m (890 ft)
- Coordinates: 44°10′34″N 7°44′02″E

Geography
- Location within Alps
- Location: Piemonte, Italy
- Parent range: Ligurian Alps

Geology
- Rock type: mainly limestone

Climbing
- First ascent: ancestral
- Easiest route: waymarked hiking route

The Cima delle Saline is a mountain of the Ligurian Alps located in Piedmont (NW Italy).

== Toponymy ==
Cima delle Saline literally means Summit of the salt marshes. The name comes the neighbouring Passo delle Saline, a mountain pass which was used in the past by marchants in order to bring into the Po Plain the salt produced by the Mediterranean sea.

== Geography ==
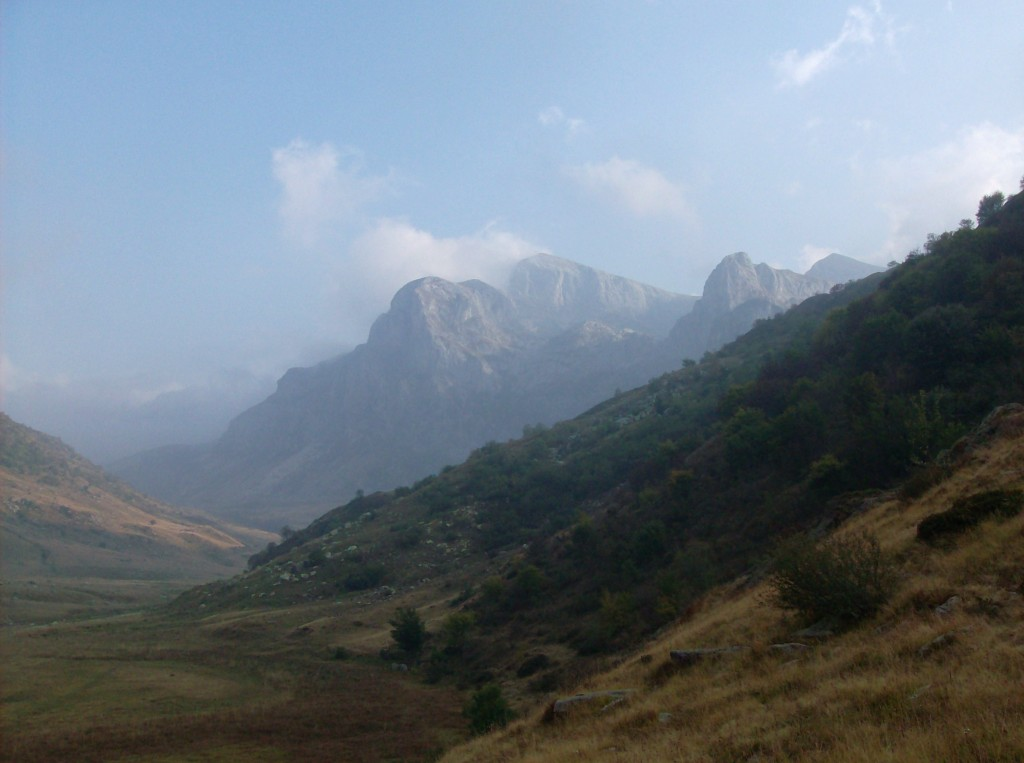
View from Pian Marchisio (Ellero Valley)

The mountain rises in the karstic complex of the Marguareis, on the water divide between the valleys of Ellero and Tanaro. At 2,612 metres above sea level, is the third elevation of the Ligurian Alps after Marguareis and Mongioie. Its prevailing rocks are Jurassic limestones. The north face of the Cima delle Saline consists in almost vertical cliffs, while its southern side is a long and gentler slope, rich in sinkholes. If seen from the plain, its summit shows a characteristic rounded shape.

=== SOIUSA classification ===
According to the SOIUSA (International Standardized Mountain Subdivision of the Alps) the mountain can be classified in the following way:

- main part = Western Alps
- major sector = South Western Alps
- section = Ligurian Alps
- subsection = It:Alpi del Marguareis/Fr:Alpes Liguriennes Occidentales
- supergroup = It:Catena Marguareis-Mongioie/Fr:Chaîne Marguareis-Mongioie
- group =It:Mongioie-Mondolè
- subgroup = It:Nodo del Mongioie
- code = I/A-1.II-B.4.a

== Conservation ==
Since 1978 the mountain and its southern slopes belong to the Natural Park of Marguareis.

== Access to the summit ==
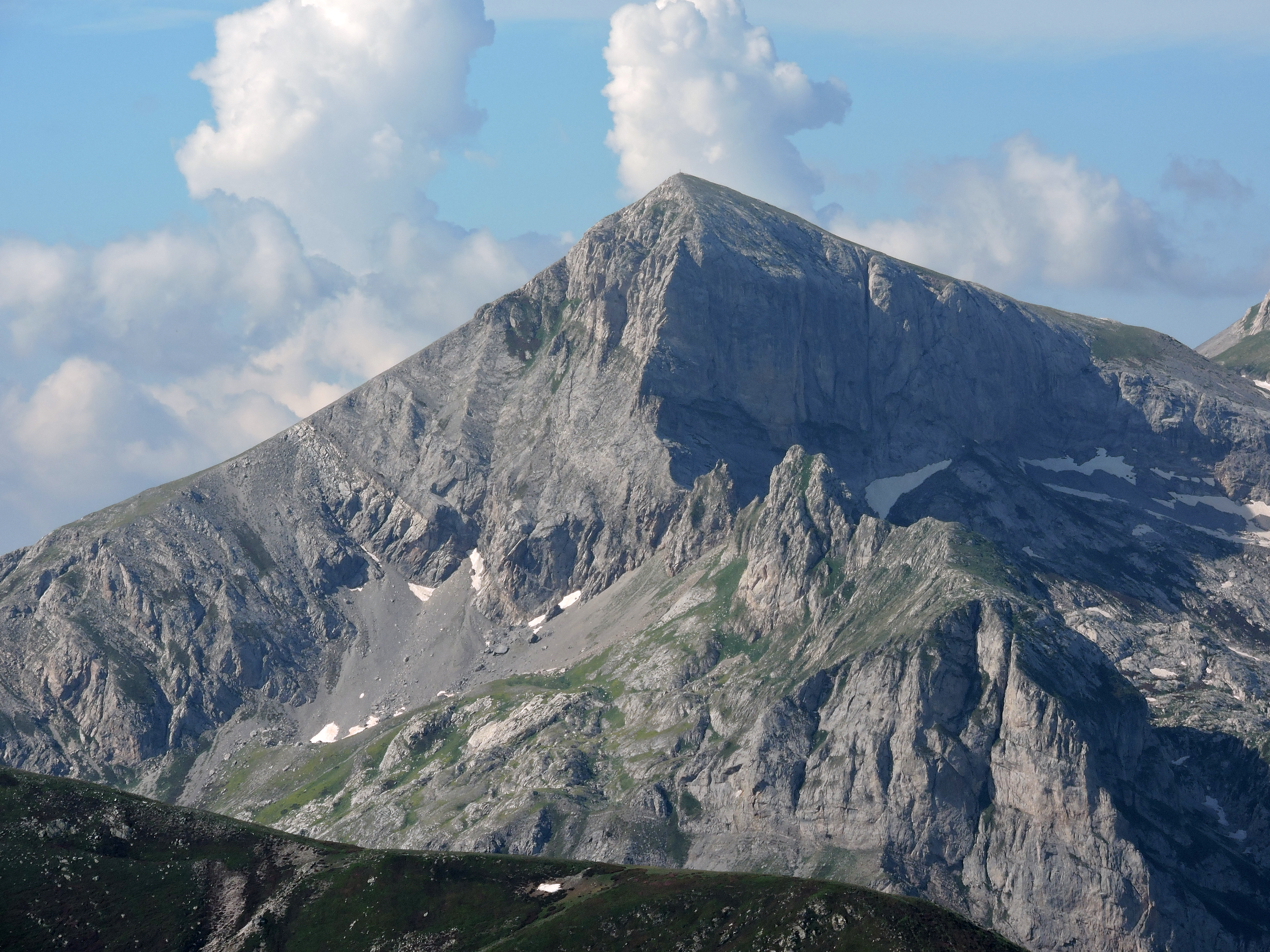
View from Mondolè

=== Summer ===
Reaching the summit does not require alpinistic skill but some scrambling. A waymarked itinerary follows the GTA route up to the Passo delle Saline (a saddle connecting Tanaro and Ellero valleys) and then the E ridge of the mountain til to the summit. It starts from Carnino Inferiore, a village of the Briga Alta comune, in the upper Tanaro valley. It is also possible to reach the summit from Pian Marchisio (Ellero Valley, North of the mountain), also through the Passo delle Saline. The Cima delle Saline is also a challenging climb for mountain biking.

=== Winter ===
The mountain is also accessible in winter by ski mountaineers, but early spring is considered the best period for this ascent.

== Mountain huts ==
- Rifugio Mongioie and Rifugio Ciarlo-Bossi (Tanaro valley),
- Rifugio Havis De Giorgio and Rifugio Garelli (Ellero valley).

== Maps ==
- Cartografia ufficiale italiana in scala 1:25.000 e 1:100.000 (Map). IGM.
- Carta in scala 1:50.000 n. 8 Alpi Marittime e Liguri (Map). Torino: Istituto Geografico Centrale.
- Carta dei sentieri e stradale scala 1:25.000 n. 22 Mondovì Val Ellero Val Maudagna Val Corsaglia Val Casotto (Map). Ciriè: Fraternali editore.
