= Negrone =

River in northwestern Italy

Coordinates: 44.12392°N 7.81474°E

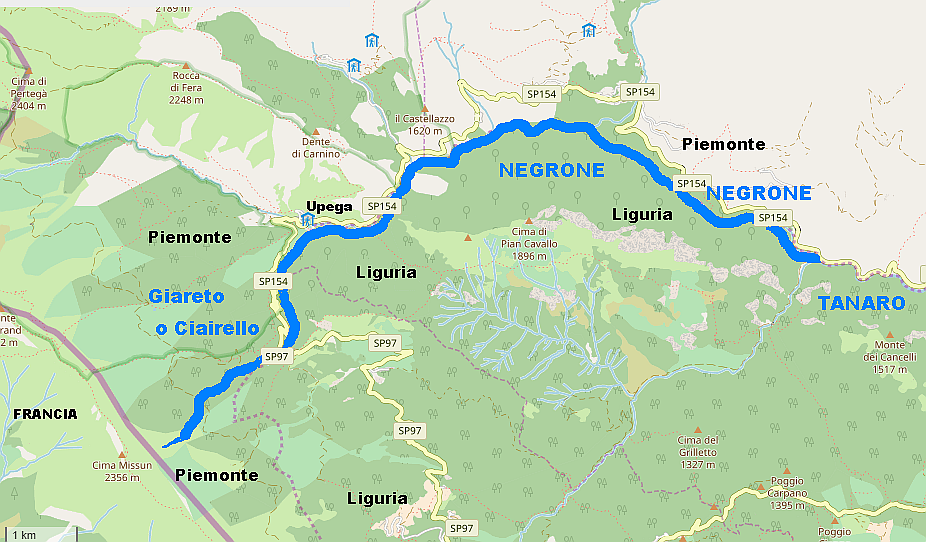
Map of the Negrone

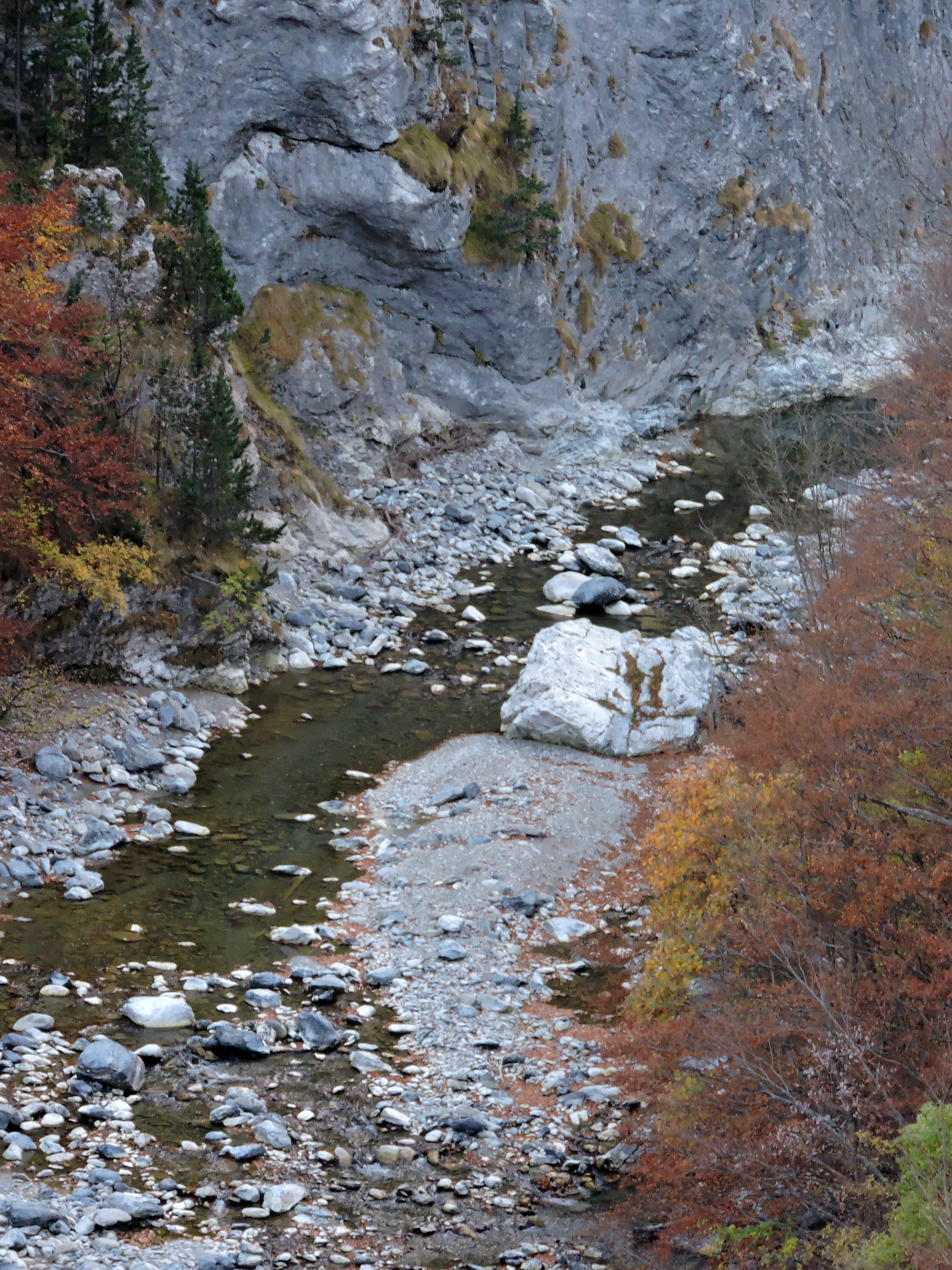
The Negrone in the Ligurian Alps

The Negrone is an 11 kilometres (6.8 mi) long stream principally in Italy that flows through the regions of Piedmont and Liguria. Rising at Cime de Missun in the Ligurian Alps of France, the river, alongside the Tanarello, forms the Tanaro river, itself a tributary of the Po. The Negrone is known by several other names in different areas.

== Etymology ==
The origin of Negrone is uncertain; a combination of negro (black) and the suffix -one, it is traced by some to the dark colour of the rocks that emerge in various parts of the creek bed, while others have suggested that the name is derived from the shadyness of the valley traversed by the stream.

== Course ==
The Negrone originates as the Giareto or Ciairello stream on the eastern slope of the Cime de Missun in the Ligurian Alps of France, near the France–Italy border. It then flows a northeasterly course into the municipality of Briga Alta, Piedmont, in Northwest Italy. After briefly flowing into Liguria, after the stream reaches the Strada Provinciale 97 road it proceeds to form the boundary between Piedmont and Liguria. After changing its name to the Corvo shorting before Upega in Piedmont, it collects the waters of the Nivorina and finally receives the name Negrone, turning eastward. After receiving the waters of the Rio Regioso, the Negrone proceeds to flow a southeasterly course. At Pian Laiardo—between the municipalities of Cosio d'Arroscia and Ormea—it is joined by the Tanarello river, giving rise to the Tanaro.
