= Colle delle Selle Vecchie =

Alpine pass between Italy and France

- Col de la Celle Vieille
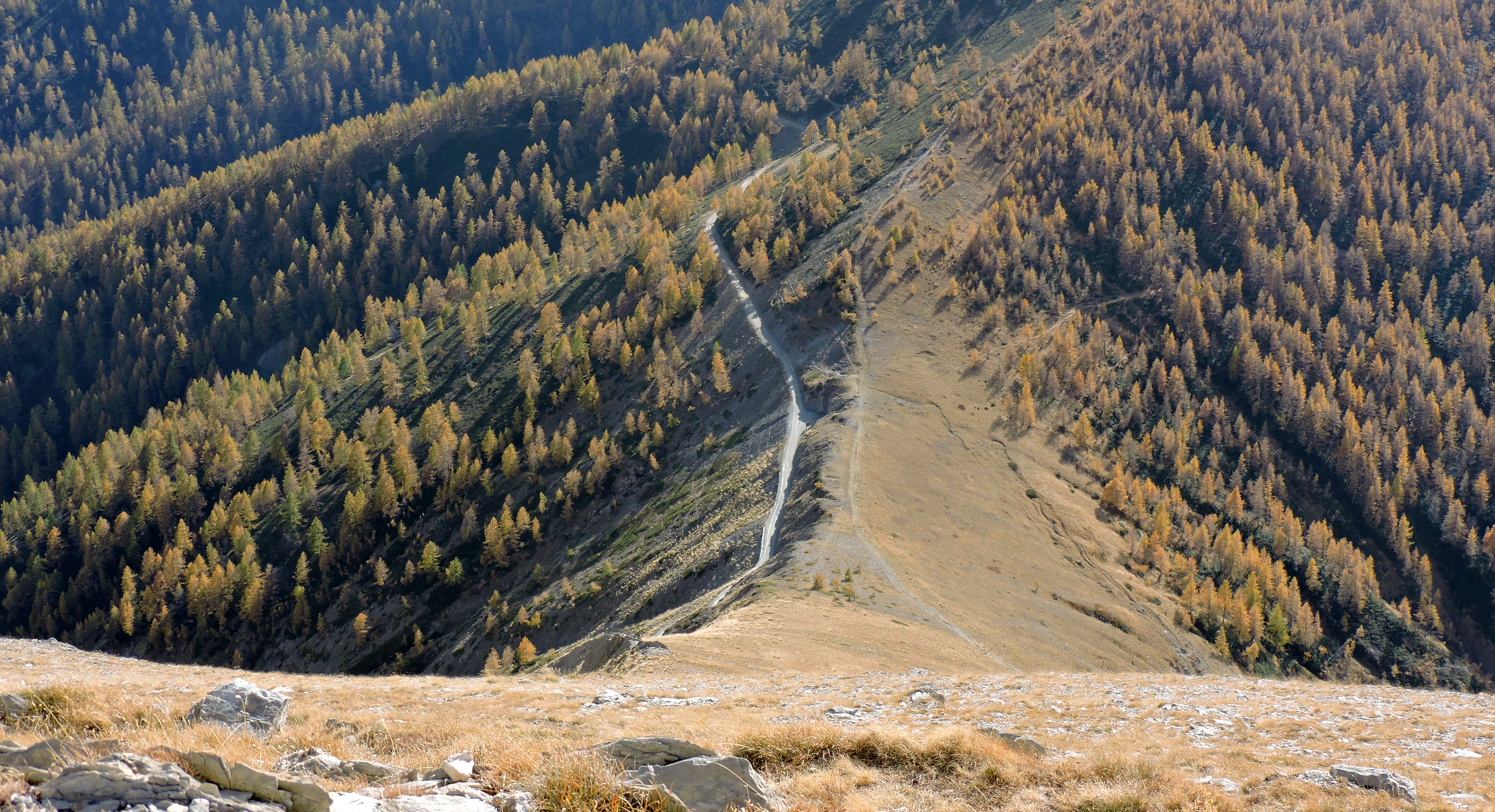
- View from the Cima di Pertegà

- Location within Alps
- Elevation: 2,097 metres (6,880 ft)
- Traversed by: former military dirt road

Third Approach
- Location: Piedmont, Italy; Provence-Alpes-Côte d'Azur, France
- Range: Ligurian Alps
- Coordinates: 44°08′32″N 7°40′36″E

Colle delle Selle Vecchie (in Italian) or Col de la Celle Vieille (in French) at 2,097 m is a mountain pass in the Ligurian Alps. It connects the valleys of Roya in France and Tanaro in Italy.

== Etymology ==
The name of the pass probably came from an old name as like Col des Sels Vieils (Old salts pass), referring to sea salt which was transported from the Ligurian Sea to Piedmont through it.

== Geography ==
The Colle delle Selle Vecchie is located on the main chain of the Alps between the Cima di Pertegà and Cime de l'Eveque with the neighbouring Monte Bertrand. It connects the basins of the Ligurian Sea (West of the pass) and the River Po. Administratively is the tripoint connecting the Italian municipality of Briga Alta, the French one of Tende and one exclave of La Brigue.

== History ==
The pass up to World War II was totally in Italian territory but, following the Paris Peace Treaties, signed in February 1947, is now on the border between Italy and France.

== Cycling ==
The pass is easily accessible with a mountain bike by following the old military road connecting the pass with Colle dei Signori and Passo Tanarello.

== See also ==
- List of mountain passes
- France–Italy border
