= Monte Bertrand =

Mountain in Italy

- French: Mont Bertrand
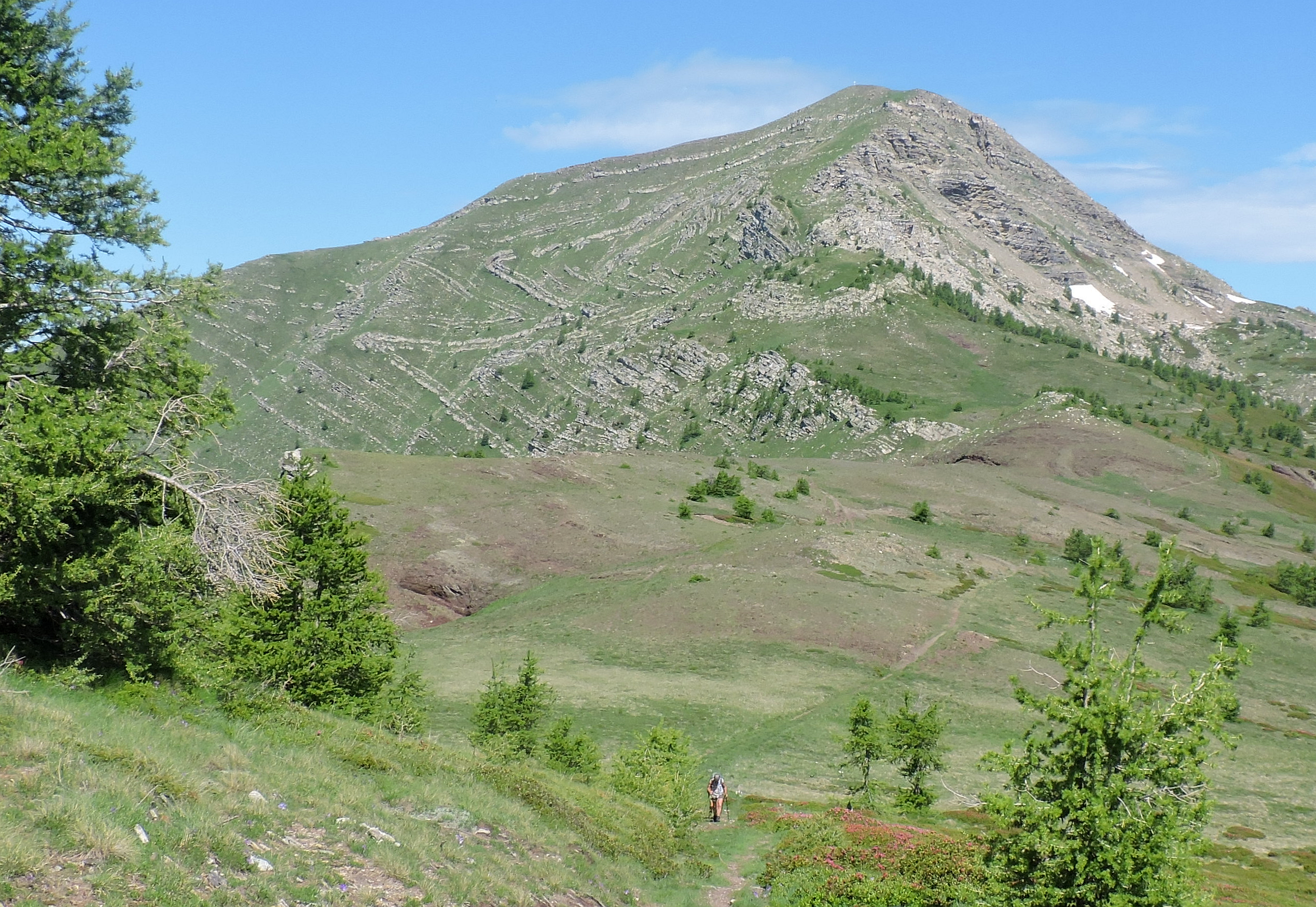

Highest point
- Elevation: 2,480 m (8,140 ft)
- Prominence: 383 m (1,257 ft)
- Isolation: 5.97 km (3.71 mi)
- Listing: Alpine mountains 2000-2499 m
- Coordinates: 44°07′05″N 7°40′28″E

Geography
- Location within Alps Location within Italy
- Location: Piemonte, Italy - Provence-Alpes-Côte d'Azur, France
- Parent range: Ligurian Alps

Climbing
- First ascent: ancestral
- Easiest route: unmarked footpath

Monte Bertrand (Italian) or Mont Bertrand (French) is a mountain located on the French-Italian border between Piemonte and Provence-Alpes-Côte d'Azur.

== History ==
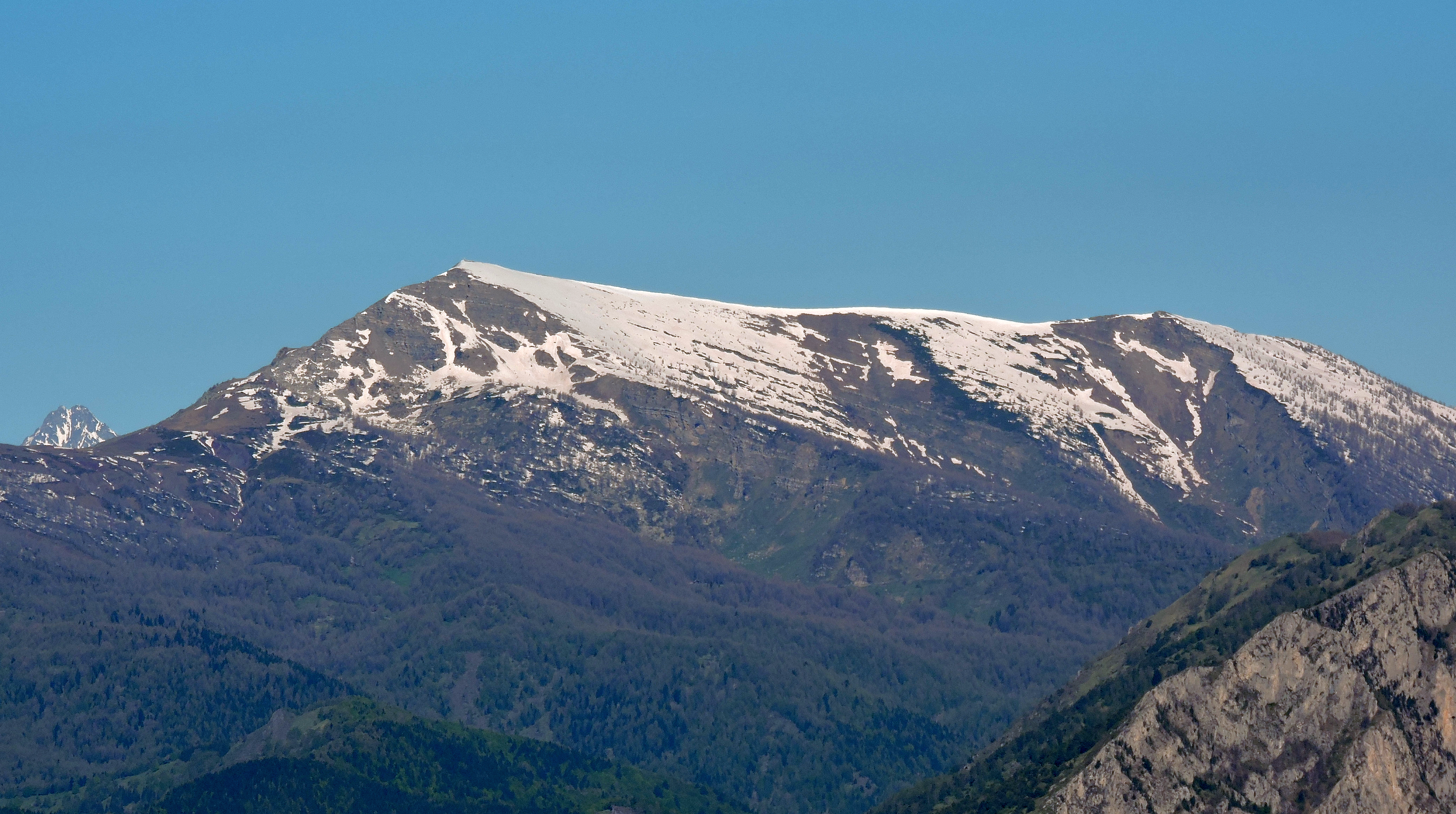
View from Monte della Guardia

The mountain up to World War II was totally belonging to Italy but, following the Paris Peace Treaties, signed in February 1947, is now shared between Italy and France.

== Geography ==
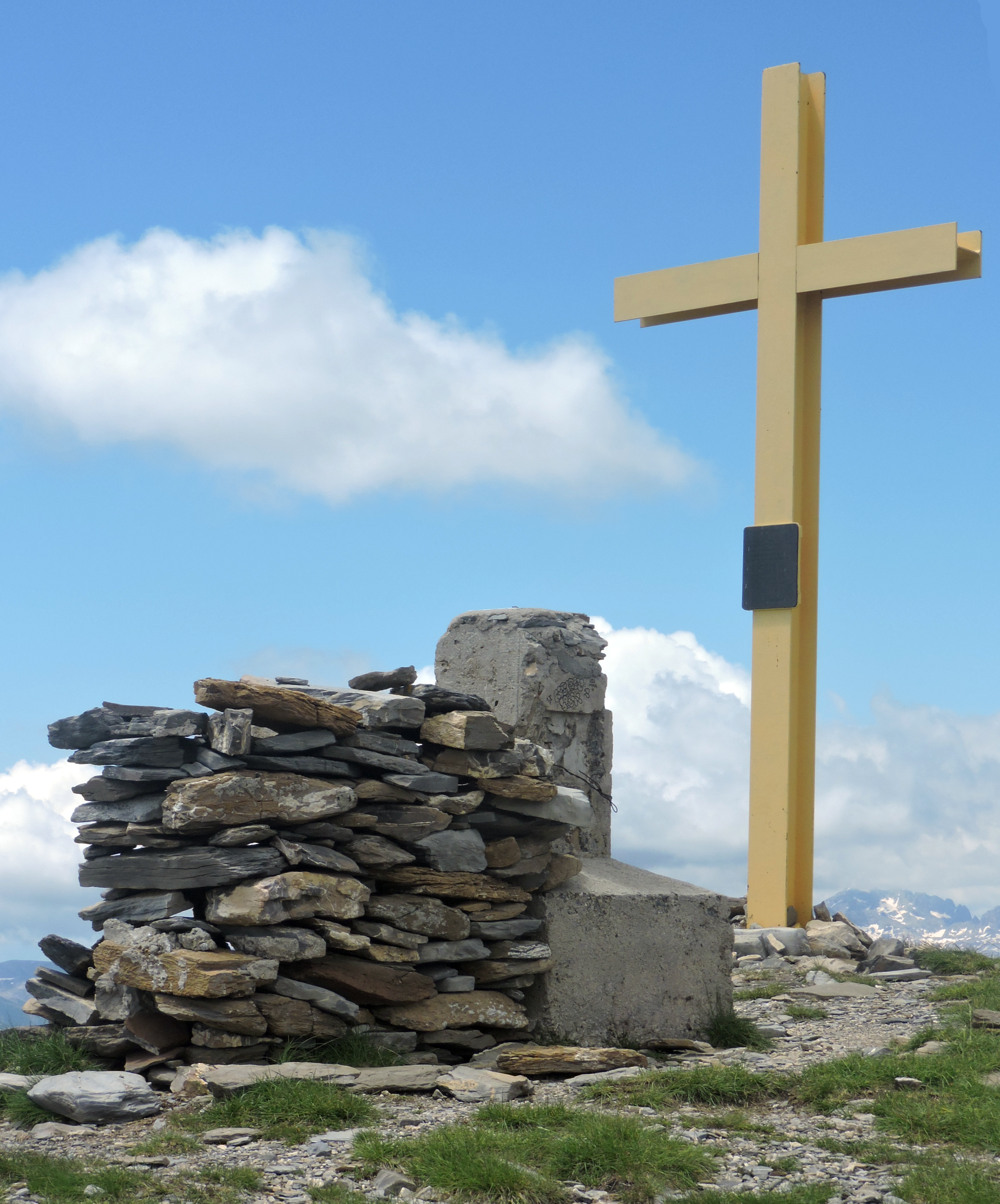
Summit cross and cairn

The mountain belongs to the Ligurian Alps and is located on the main chain of the Alps. On its top three ridges meet; one of them heads West dividing two tributary valleys of the Roya, Vallon du Réfrei (north) and Vallon du Morignole. Going North the main chain of the Alps connects the mountain with the Colle delle Selle Vecchie, while southwards the saddle of Colla Rossa (2172 m) divides the Monte Bertrand from the neighbouring Cime de Missun. On the Italian side of the mountain runs a former-military dirt road connecting Monesi (a village of the municipality of Triora) with the colle di Tenda. The summit of the Monte Bertrand is marked by a cairn and a summit cross and can be easily seen from Upega, a village of the iItalian comune of Briga Alta, and by Morignolo, located in the French mairie of La Brigue.

=== SOIUSA classification ===
According to the SOIUSA (International Standardized Mountain Subdivision of the Alps) the mountain can be classified in the following way:

- main part = Western Alps
- major sector = South Western Alps
- section = Ligurian Alps
- subsection = (It:Alpi del Marguareis/Fr:Alpes Liguriennes Occidentales)
- supergroup = (It:Catena del Saccarello /Fr:Chaîne du Mont Saccarel)
- group = (It:Gruppo del Monte Saccarello /Fr:Groupe du Mont Saccarel)
- subgroup = (It:Nodo del Monte Saccarello /Fr:Nœud du Mont Saccarel)
- code = I/A-1.II-A.1.a

== Environment ==
The mountain is made of steep but regular and mainly grassy slopes on its western side, and is rockier on the eastern one. Its NE slopes are included in the Parco naturale del Marguareis.

== Hiking ==
The mountain is accessible by an unmarked footpaths both from the saddle of Colla Rossa (South) and from the Colle delle Selle Vecchie (in the second case crossing the Cima Valega).

== Maps ==
- Cartografia ufficiale italiana in scala 1:25.000 e 1:100.000 (Map). Istituto Geografico Militare.
- Géoportail (French official maps) (Map). Institut géographique national.
- Carta in scala 1:50.000 n. 8 Alpi Marittime e Liguri (Map). Torino: Istituto Geografico Centrale.

== See also ==
Media related to Monte Bertrand at Wikimedia Commons

- France–Italy border
