= Colle dei Signori =

Alpine pass between Italy and France

- Col des Seigneurs
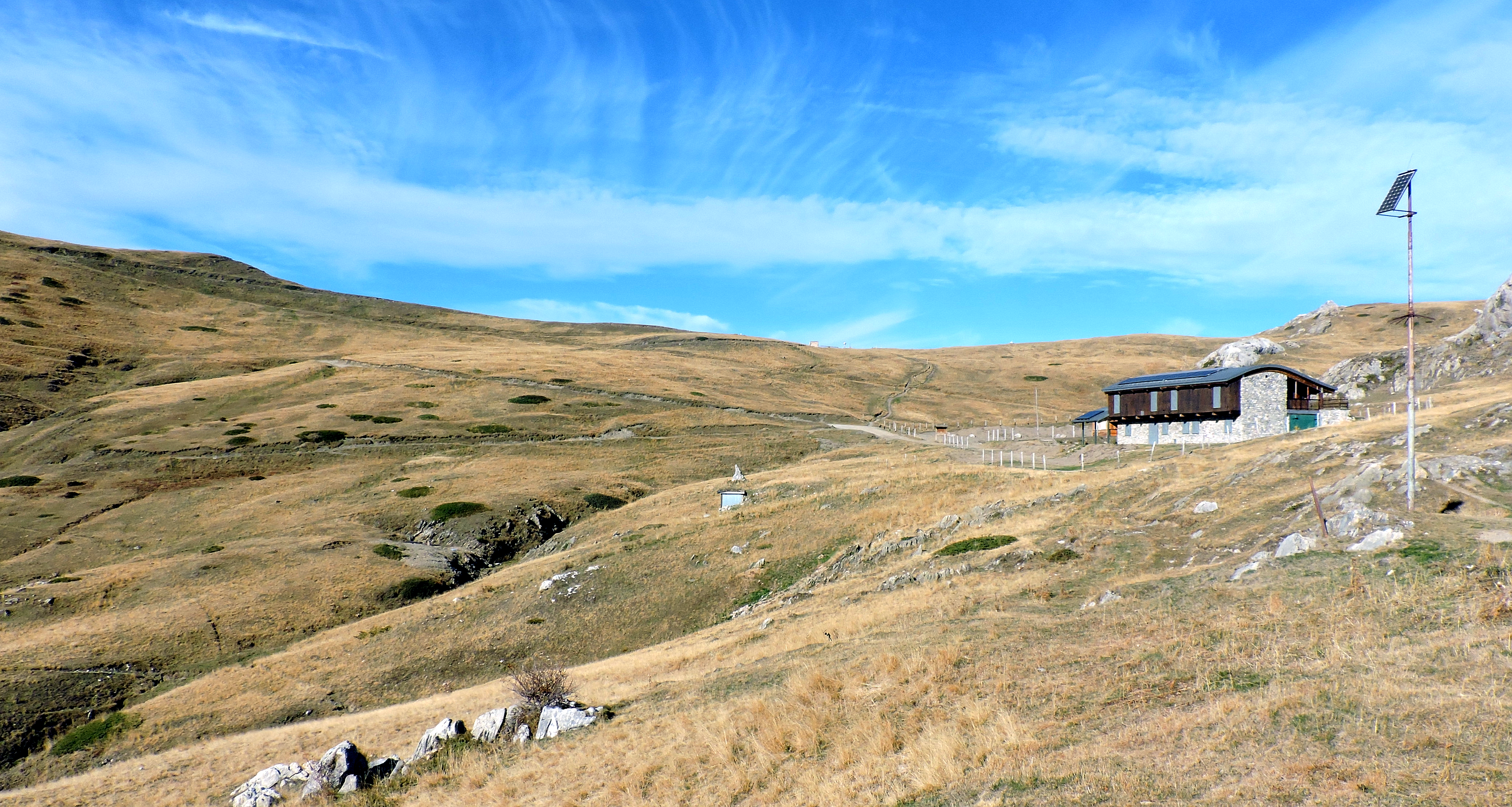
- View from the Italian side

- Location within Alps
- Elevation: 2,107 metres (6,913 ft)
- Traversed by: former military dirt road

Third Approach
- Location: Piedmont, Italy; Provence-Alpes-Côte d'Azur, France
- Range: Ligurian Alps
- Coordinates: 44°09′30″N 7°40′17″E

The Colle dei Signori (in Italian) or Col des Seigneurs (in French) at 2,107 m is a mountain pass in the Ligurian Alps. It connects the valleys of Roya in France and Tanaro in Italy.

== Geography ==
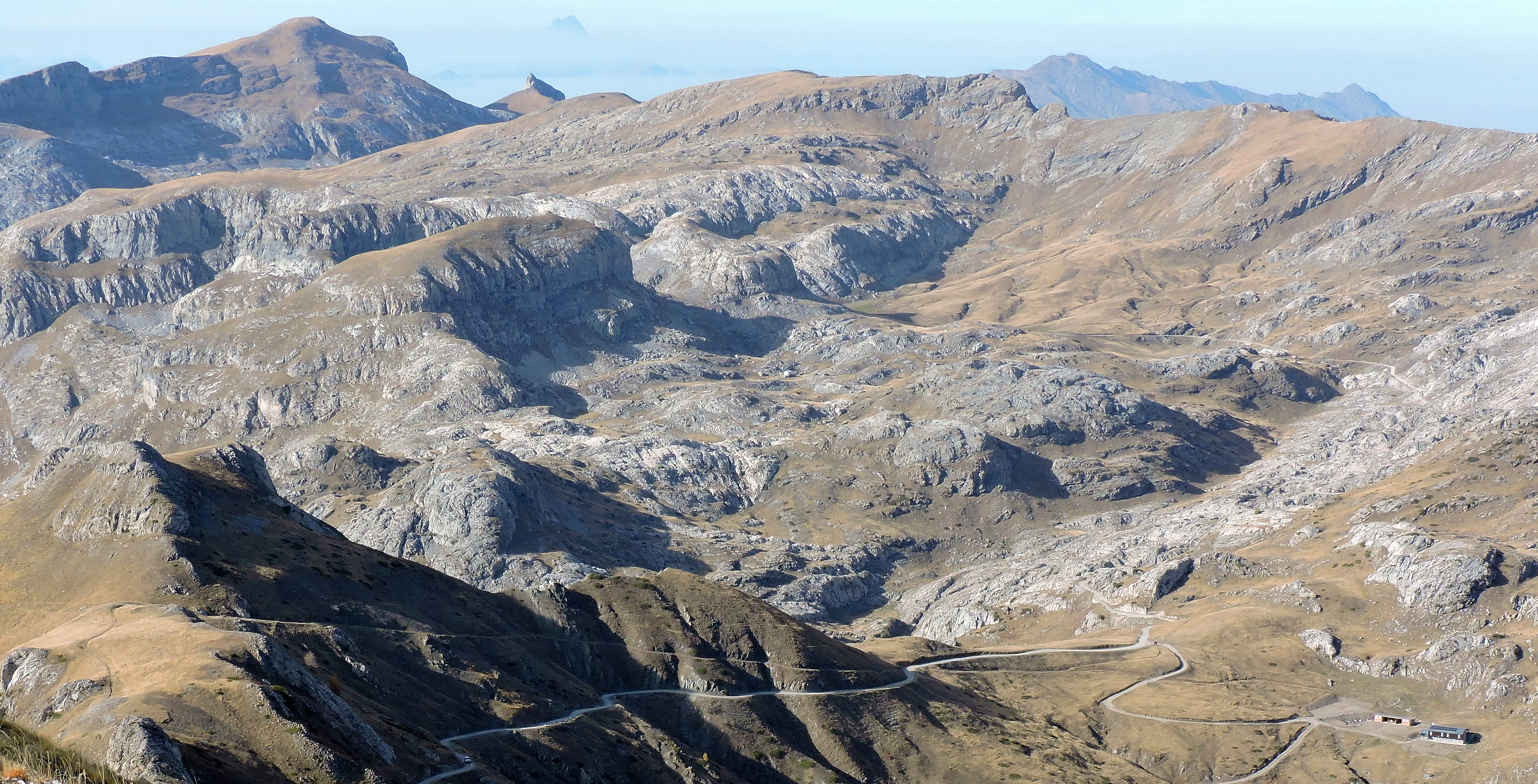
The pass seen from the Cima di Pertegà

The Colle dei Signori is located on the main chain of the Alps between the Cime de Capoves and Cima di Gaina. It connects the basins of the Ligurian Sea (West of the pass) and the River Po. Administratively is located between Italian municipality of Briga Alta and one exclave of the French municipality of La Brigue.

== History ==
The pass up to World War II was totally in Italian territory but, following the Paris Peace Treaties, signed in February 1947, is now on the border between Italy and France.

== Cycling ==
The pass is easily accessible with a mountain bike by following the old military road.

== See also ==
- List of mountain passes
- France–Italy border
