= Cime de Capoves =

Mountain in Italy

- Cima Capoves
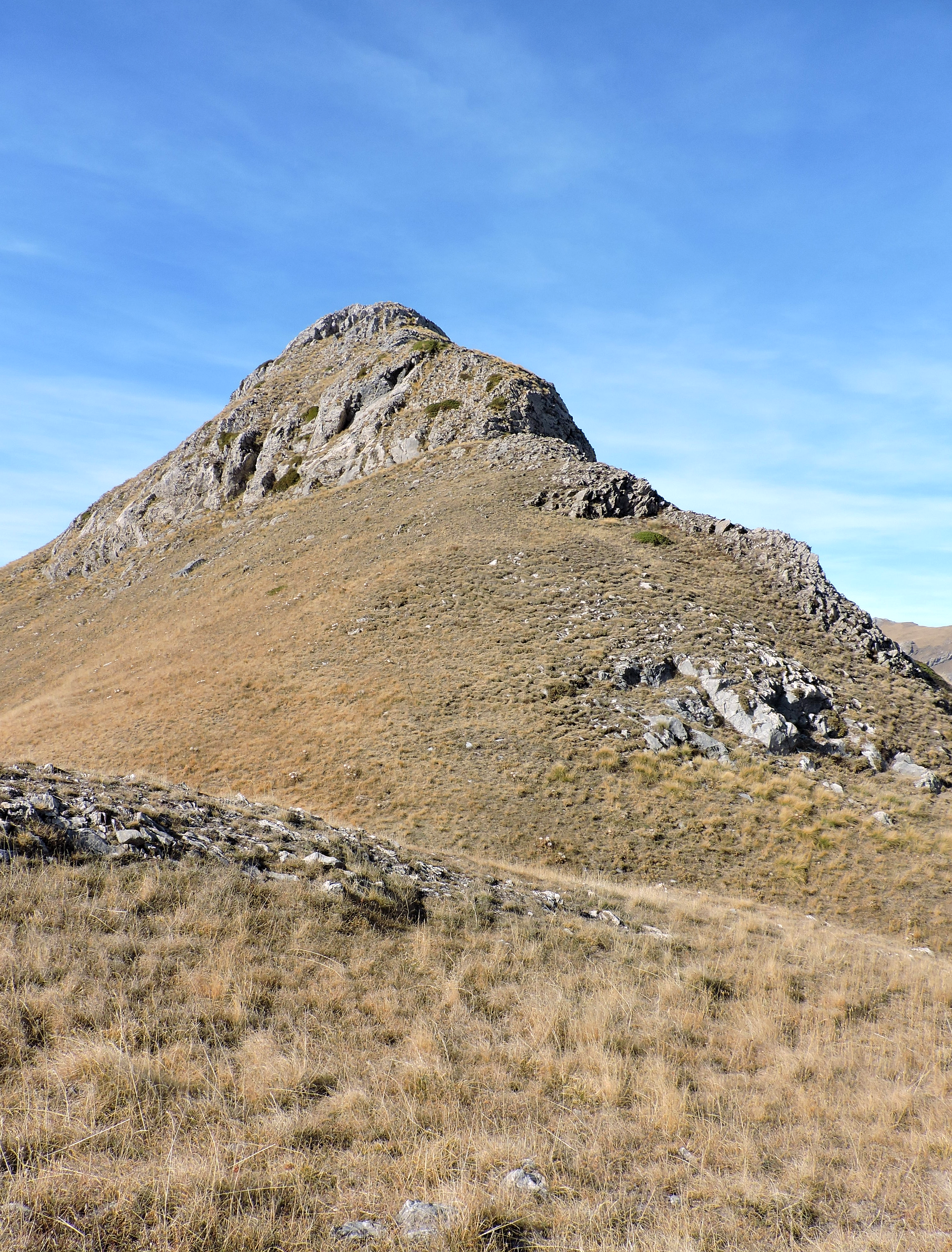

Highest point
- Elevation: 2,260 m (7,410 ft)
- Prominence: 53 m (174 ft)
- Coordinates: 44°09′14″N 7°40′09″E

Geography
- Location within Alps
- Location: Provence-Alpes-Côte d'Azur, France
- Parent range: Ligurian Alps

Climbing
- First ascent: ancestral
- Easiest route: step meadows and some scrambling

The Cime de Capoves (French) or Cima Capoves (Italian) is a mountain of the Ligurian Alps located in the French region of Provence-Alpes-Côte d'Azur, close to the French-Italian border.

== History ==
The Cime the Capoves up to World War II belonged to Italy but, following the Paris Peace Treaties, signed in February 1947, is now in France because the France–Italy border runs between Colle dei Signori and Colle di Capeves east of the mountain.

== Geography ==
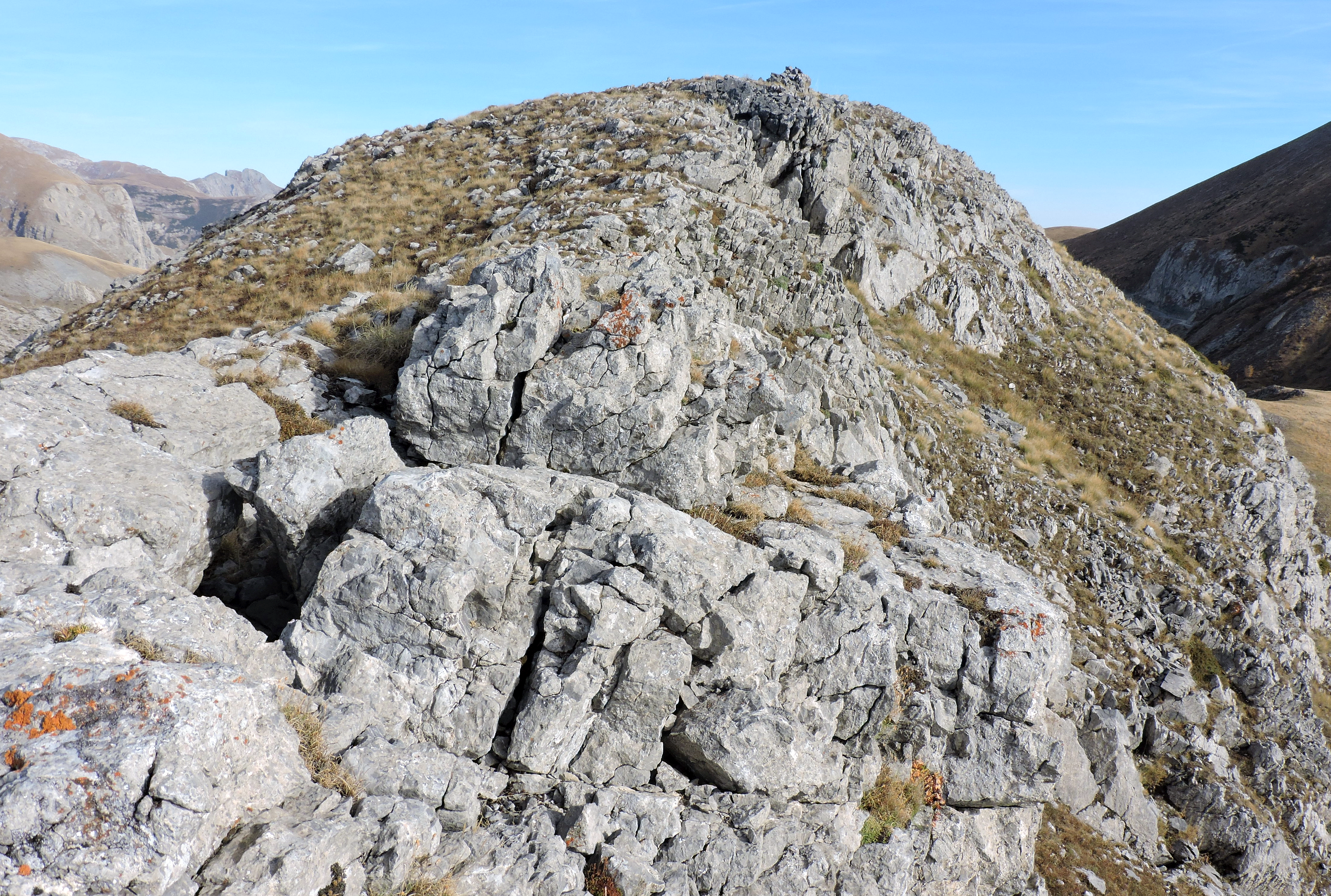
Northern view

The mountain belongs to the Ligurian Alps and is located on the main chain of the Alps. Going South a saddle at 2.007 m, sometimes named Colle di Capoves, divides it from the Cima di Pertegà, while going North the Cime de Capoves is divided from the Cima Gaina by the Colle dei Signori. On the eastern side of the mountain runs a former-military dirt road connecting Monesi (a village of the municipality of Triora) with the colle di Tenda. The summit is marked by a stone cairn and administratively belongs to an exclave of the Frenc municipality of La Brigue.

=== SOIUSA classification ===
According to the SOIUSA (International Standardized Mountain Subdivision of the Alps) the mountain can be classified in the following way:

- main part = Western Alps
- major sector = South Western Alps
- section = Ligurian Alps
- subsection = (It:Alpi del Marguareis/Fr:Alpes Liguriennes Occidentales)
- supergroup = (It:Catena Marguareis-Mongioie/Fr:Chaîne Marguareis-Mongioie)
- group = (It:Gruppo del Marguareis/Fr:Groupe du Marguareis)
- subgroup = (It:Nodo del Marguareis/Fr:Nœud du Marguareis)
- code = I/A-1.II-B.2.a

== Hiking ==
The mountain is accessible by walking tracks starting from the footpath connecting Colle dei Signori and Colle di Capoves.

== Mountain huts ==
- Rifugio Don Barbera

== Maps ==
- Cartografia ufficiale italiana in scala 1:25.000 e 1:100.000 (Map). Istituto Geografico Militare.
- Géoportail (French official maps) (Map). Institut géographique national.
- Carta in scala 1:50.000 n. 8 Alpi Marittime e Liguri (Map). Torino: Istituto Geografico Centrale.
