= Upega =

Upega Üpega (Brigasc dialect)
- Comune
- Comune di Upega
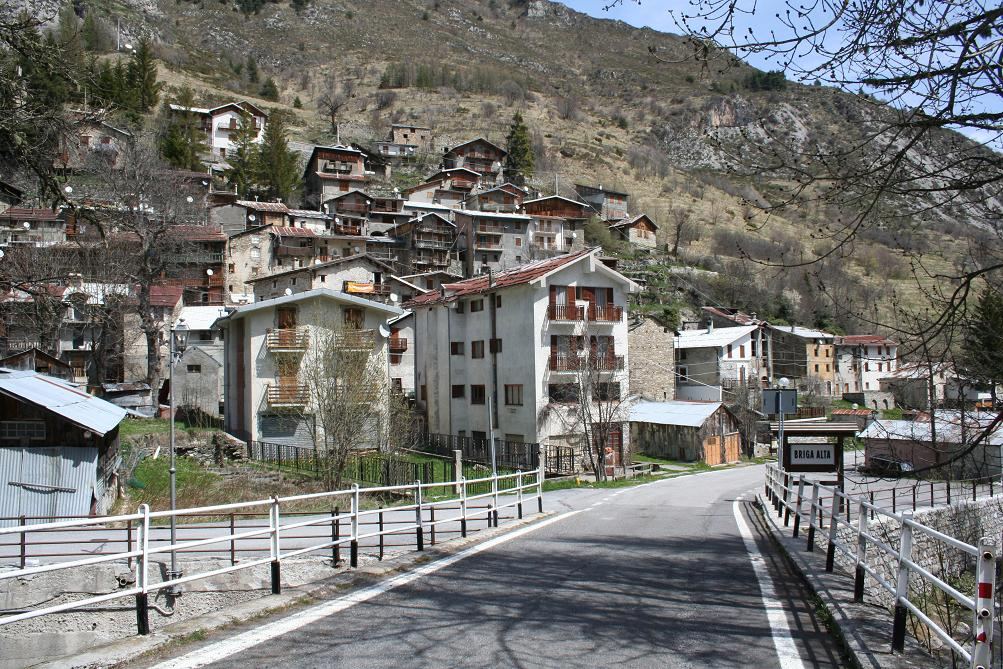

- Location within Italy Location within Piedmont
- Coordinates: 44°07′44″N 7°43′38″E
- Country: Italy
- Region: Piedmont
- Province: Cuneo
- Elevation: 1,291 m (4,236 ft)
- Time zone: UTC+1 (CET)
  - Summer (DST): UTC+2 (CEST)
- Postal code: 12078
- Patron saint: Saint Anne
- Saint day: 26 July

Upega (Brigasc dialect: Üpega) is a frazione—similar to a hamlet—located in the comune (municipality) of Briga Alta, Province of Cuneo in the region of Piedmont, Italy. It is one of three frazioni that form Briga Alta, alongside Carnino and Piaggia. Located in the Upper Tanaro Valley of the Passo Tanarello mountain pass in the Ligurian Alps, the Negrone, which forms the Tanaro river, flows through Upega. Located in the Terra Brigasca culture, it is one of a handful of villages where the Brigasc dialect of the Ligurian language is spoken.
