= Piaggia =

Piaggia A Ciagia (Brigasc dialect)
- Comune
- Comune di Piaggia
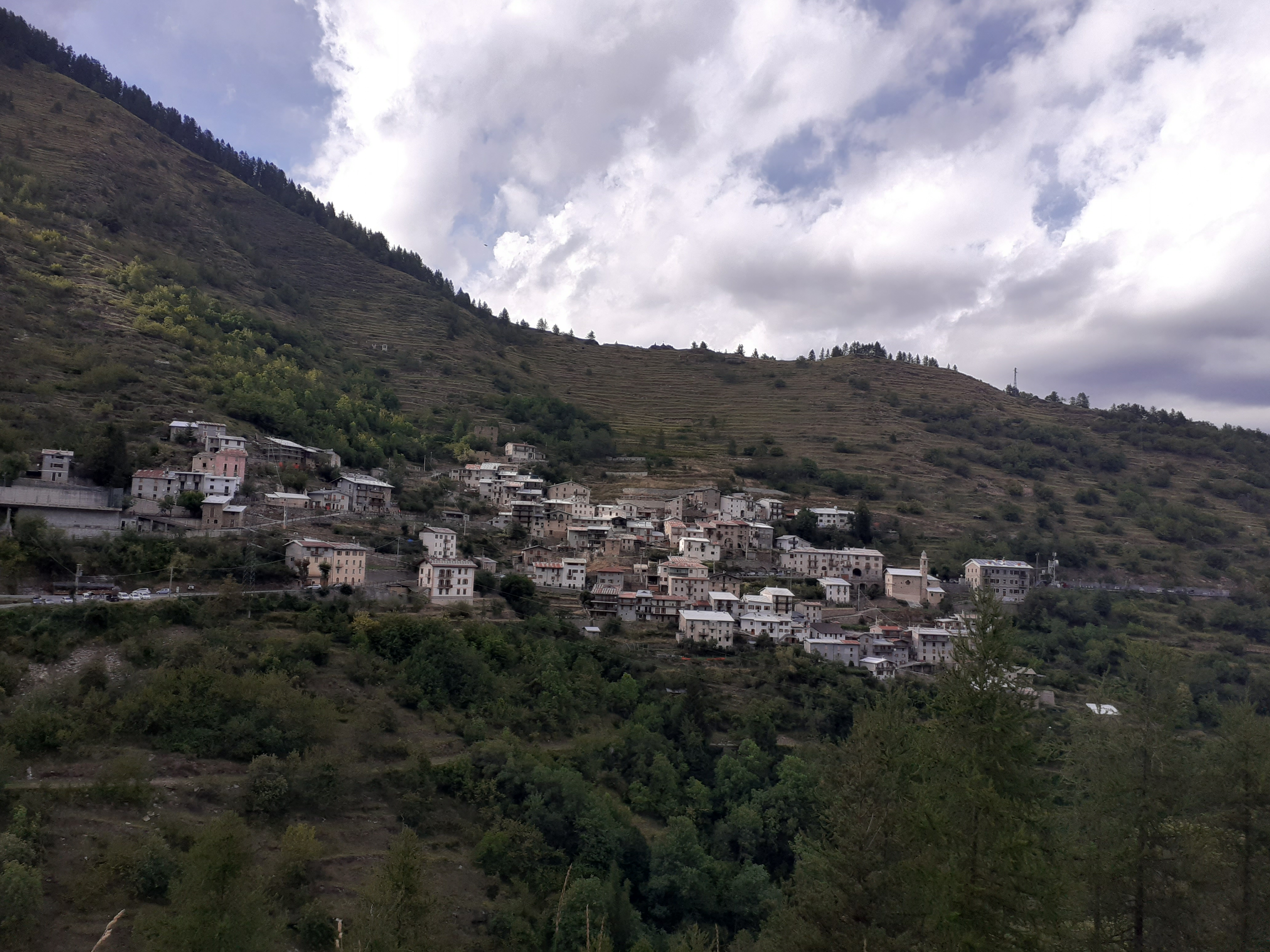
- Piaggia

- Location of Piaggia in Italy Piaggia (Piedmont)
- Country: Italy
- Region: Piedmont
- Province: Cuneo
- Elevation: 1,310 m (4,300 ft)
- Demonym: Piaggiesi
- Time zone: UTC+1 (CET)
  - Summer (DST): UTC+2 (CEST)
- Postal code: 18025

Piaggia (Brigasc dialect: A Ciagia; Ligurian: A Ciàzza) is a frazione—comparable to a hamlet—located in the comune (municipality) of Briga Alta, Province of Cuneo in the region of Piedmont, Italy. It is one of three frazioni that form Briga Alta, alongside Carnino and Upega. Located near the Upper Tanaro Valley on the slopes of Monte Saccarello in the Ligurian Alps, is the southernmost village in Piedmont. It is one of a handful of villages where the Brigasc dialect of the Ligurian language is spoken.
