= Tanarello =

River in northwestern Italy

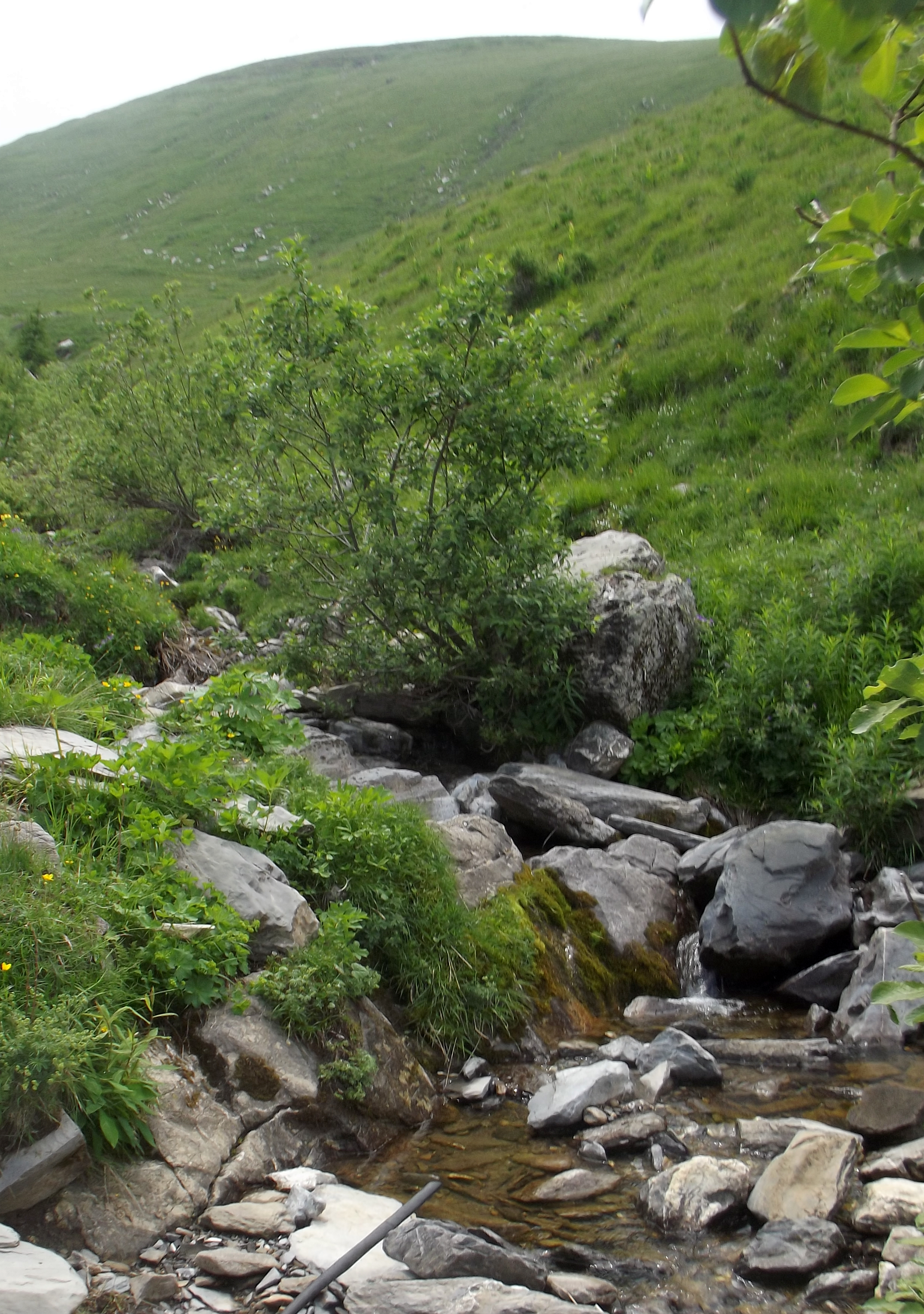
- The Tanarello in the Ligurian Alps

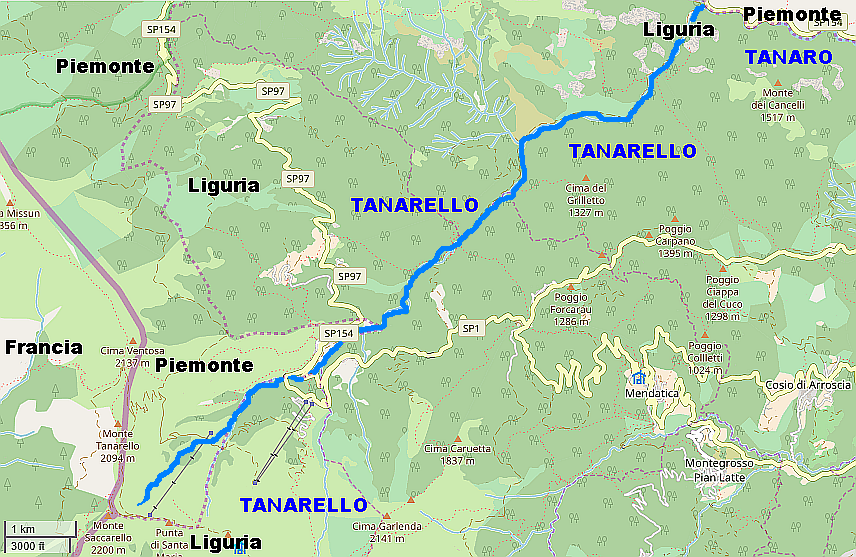
- Map of the course of the Tanarello

Location
- Country: Italy

Physical characteristics
- Source
  - location: Monte Saccarello, Ligurian Alps, Province of Cuneo, Piedmont
  - elevation: 2,119 metres (6,952 ft)
- Mouth
  - location: Tanaro river, Pian Laiardo, Province of Imperia, Liguria
  - coordinates: 44.12392°N 7.81474°E

The Tanarello is a small river (stream) in Italy that gives rise to—alongside the Negrone—the Tanaro river in Liguria. Rising from springs located on the northern slope of Monte Saccarello in the Ligurian Alps in Piedmont, the Tanarello flows a northerly course into Linguria, before joining the Negrone at Pian Laiardo—between the municipalities of Cosio d'Arroscia and Ormea—to form the Tanaro.

== Course ==
The Tanarello rises from springs located on the northern slope of Monte Saccarello in the Ligurian Alps, in the Province of Cuneo, Piedmont, Italy. It flows an easterly course through the municipality of Briga Alta, then takes a northeasterly course once it reaches the Province of Imperia in Liguria. Maintaining its course, it passes through the village of Monesi before reaching Pian Laiardo—between the municipalities of Cosio d'Arroscia and Ormea—where it is joined by the Negrone river, giving rise to the Tanaro.

== Tributaries ==
The Tanarello receives the waters of several rivers:

- Left bank:
  - Bavera
  - Sepae
  - Inferno
  - Moneghe
  - Piniella
- Right bank:
  - Scandolaro
  - Fonda
