= Natural Park of Marguareis =

Nature reserve in Italy

- Parco Naturale del Marguareis
- IUCN category IV (habitat/species management area)
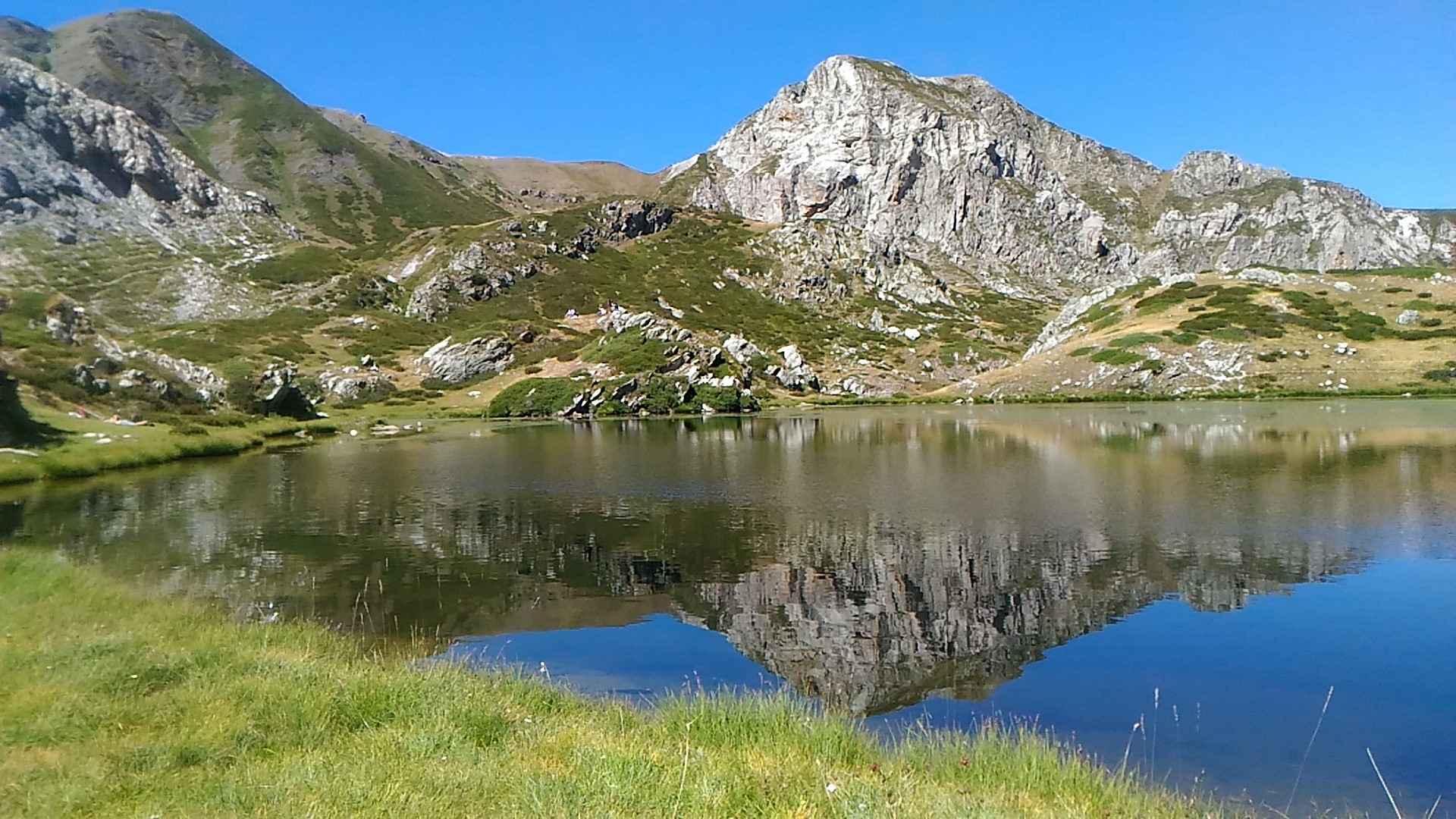

- Location within Italy
- Location: Cuneo Province, Italy
- Nearest city: Cuneo and Imperia
- Coordinates: 44°13′47″N 7°39′16″E
- Area: 8,403 ha (20,760 acres)
- Established: 1978
- Governing body: Ente di gestione delle aree protette delle Alpi Marittime (Valdieri)
- Website: www.parcomarguareis.it

The Natural Park of Marguareis(in Italian Parco Naturale del Marguareis) is a regional natural park of the Ligurian Alps located in the Province of Cuneo (Piedmont, Italy).

== History ==
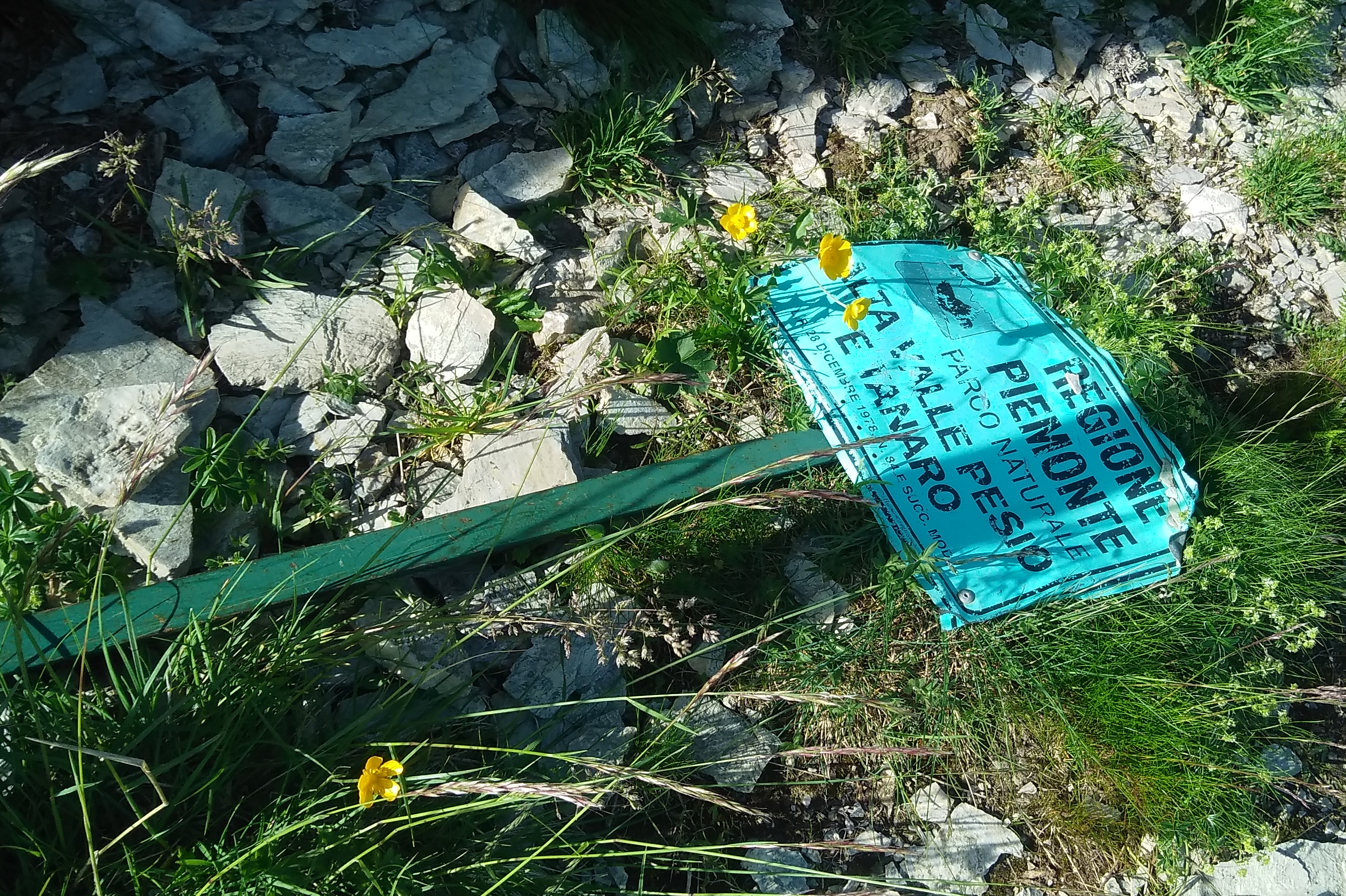
Dismanteled sign with the old name

The protected area was established by the regional government of Piemonte on 28 December 1978, enforcing the legge regionale nr.43 of 1975. It was the first protected area of the Province of Cuneo.

Up to 31 December 2011 it was named Parco naturale dell'Alta valle Pesio e Tanaro, then it changed its name in Parco Naturale del Marguareis.

== Environment ==
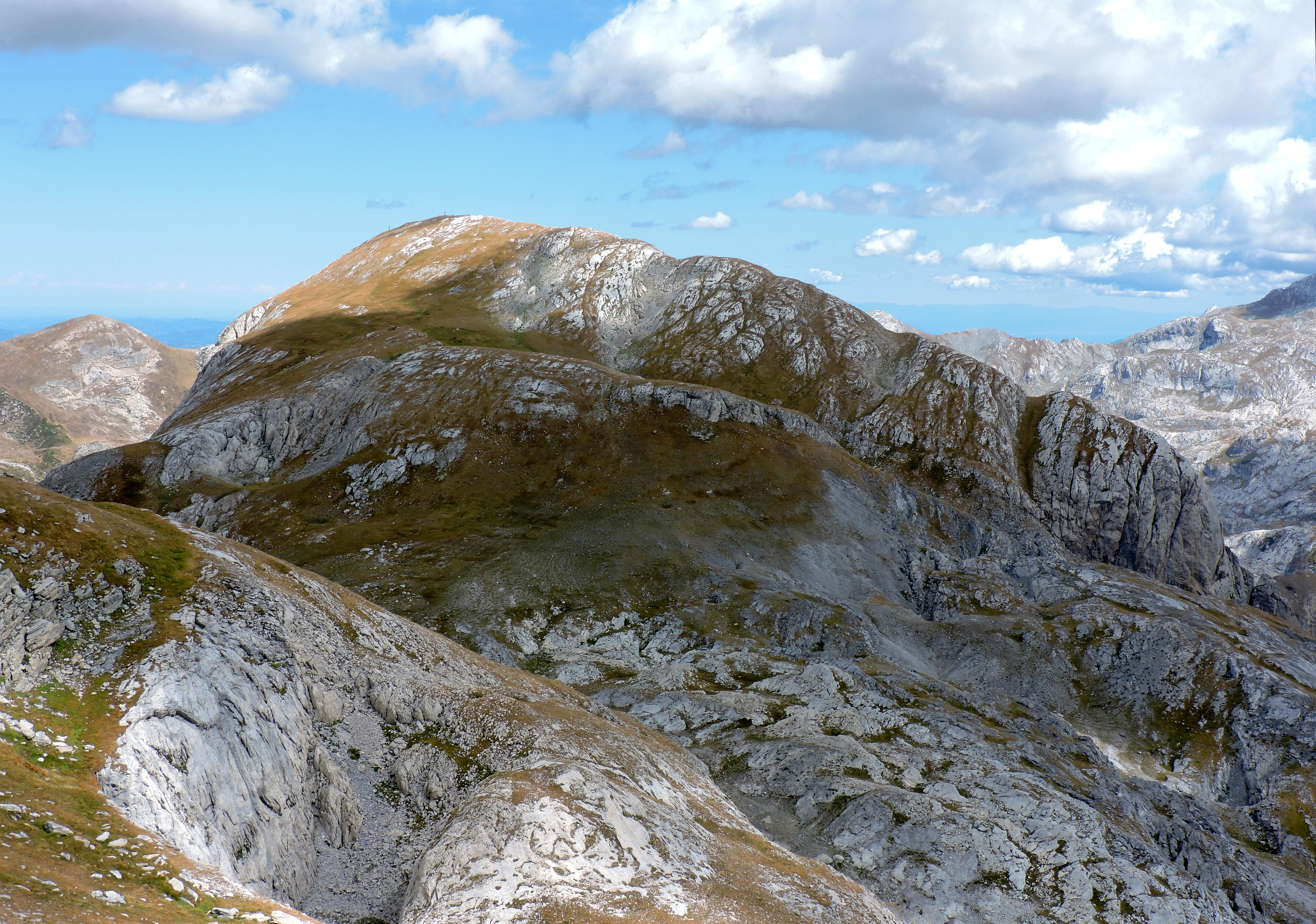
Cima delle Saline as seen from Pian Ballaur

The park covers a wide area of the piedmontese side of the Ligurian Alps. Its territory is known as Piccole Dolomiti (Small Dolomites), and underground there is a very large complex of karstic caves. Among the summits totally or partially belonging to the park can be cited, in addition to the Punta Marguareis from which the protected area takes its name, also Cima delle Saline, Cima Cars, Monte Bertrand and Cima della Fascia.

== Flora ==
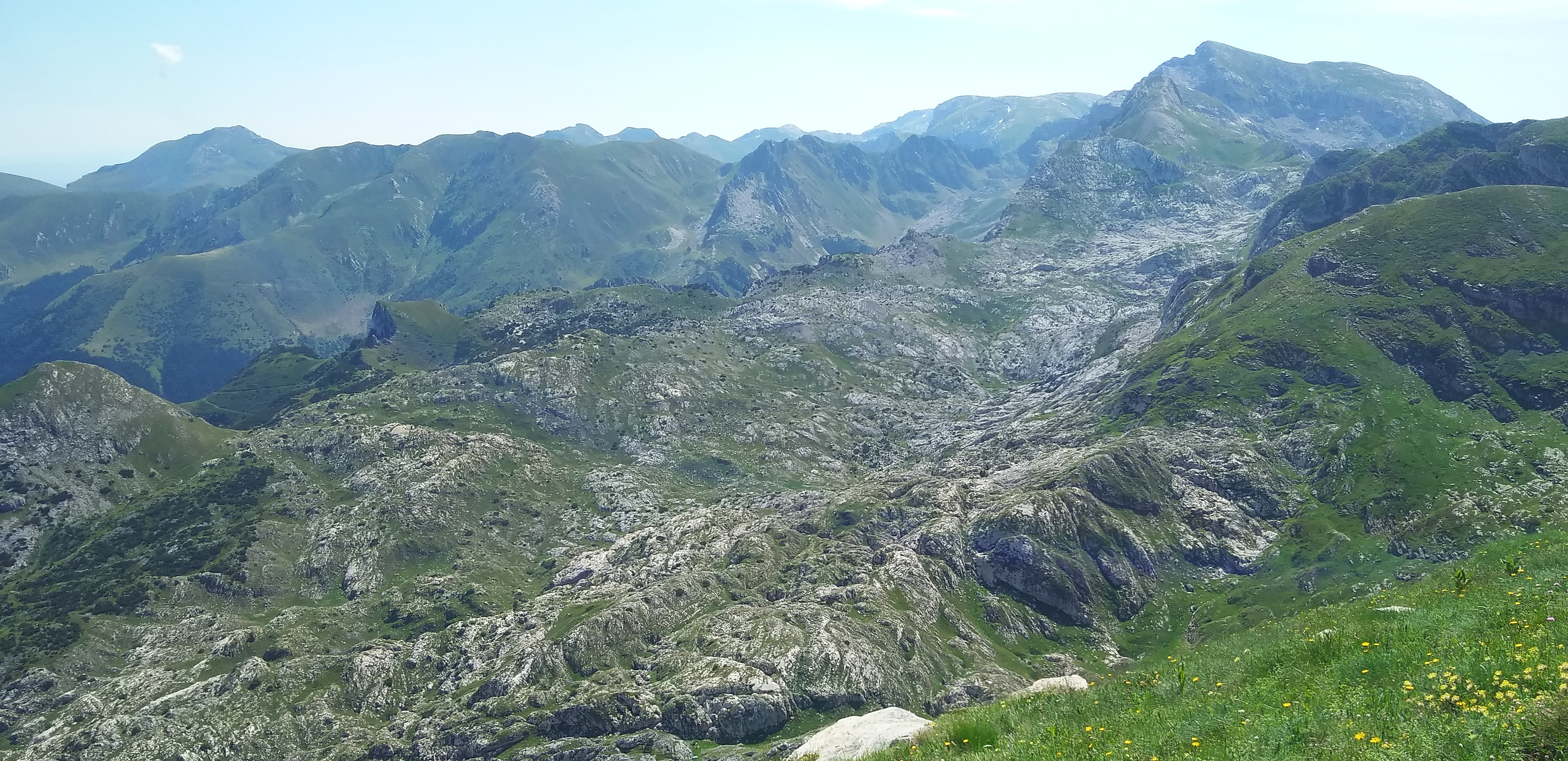
Conca delle Carsene, a karstic pleteau in the park

A wide parn of the regional park consists in woodland (mainly beechwoods and woods of silver fir and European larch), whose development was favored by the monks of the Certosa of Pesio. The peculiar climate of the area, which shows bot Alpine and Mediterranean features, as well as its Karstic geology, sustain a very remarkable vegetal biodiversity. In the protected area indeed have been recorded about 1,500 different plant species; among them are quite remarkable Saxifraga cernua, Viola pinnata and the nowadays extremely rare Cypripedium calceolus.

== Fauna ==
Among the most striking animals of the park can be cited typically alpine species like chamois, alpine marmot, golden eagle and black grouse. The presence of wolves, sign of a good environmental state of the area, dates back to mid-1990s, when settled in the Park the first documented pack of wolves in the Italian Alps after the disappearance of the specie of the 19th century.

== Hiking ==
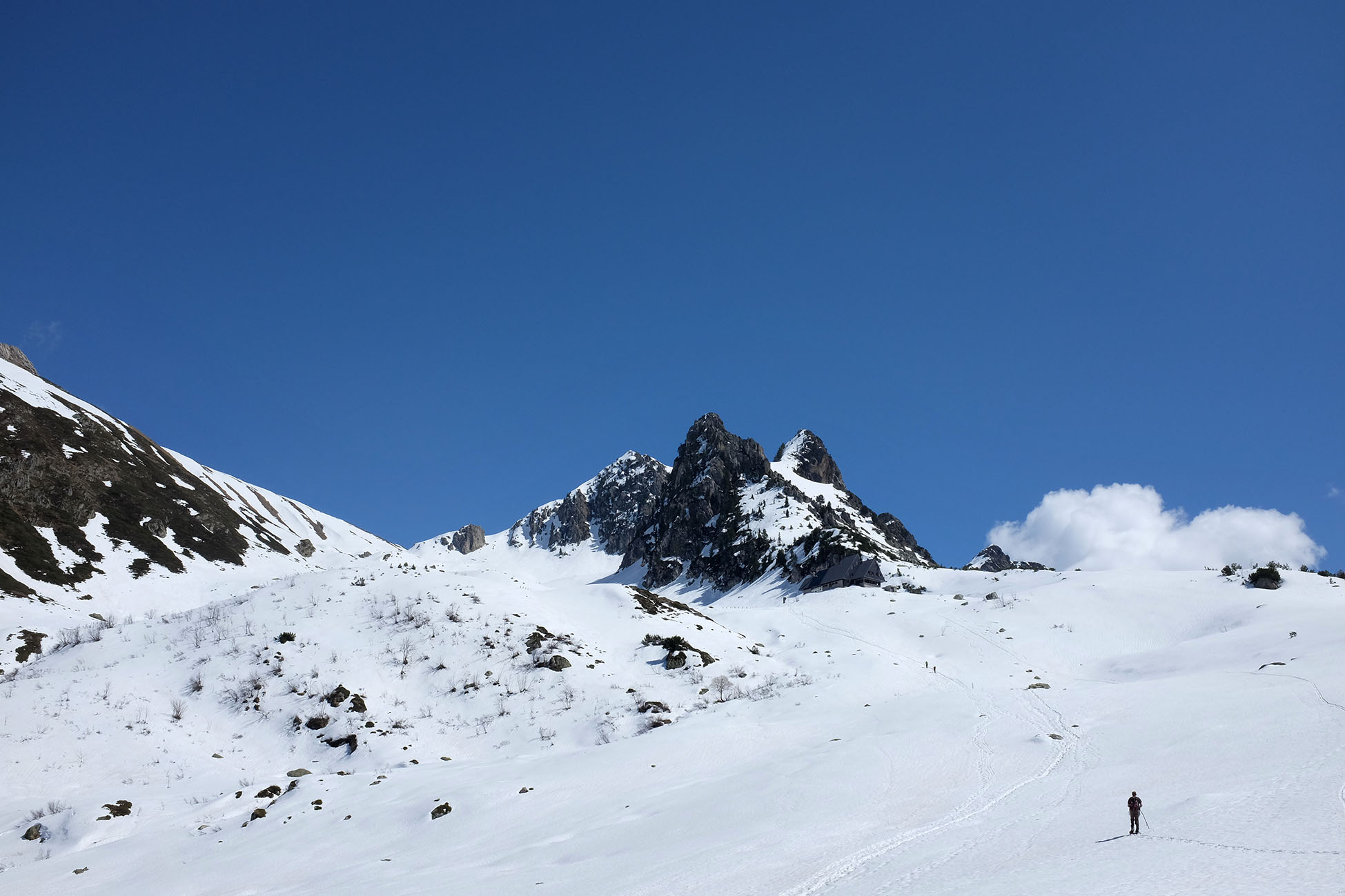
Winter hiking in the park

A well developed network of waymarked footpaths is available within the park, that is also crossed by the southernmost part of the GTA, a long-distance hiking trail which runs on the piedmontese Alps.
