= Cime de Missun =

Mountain in Italy

- Italian: Cima Missun
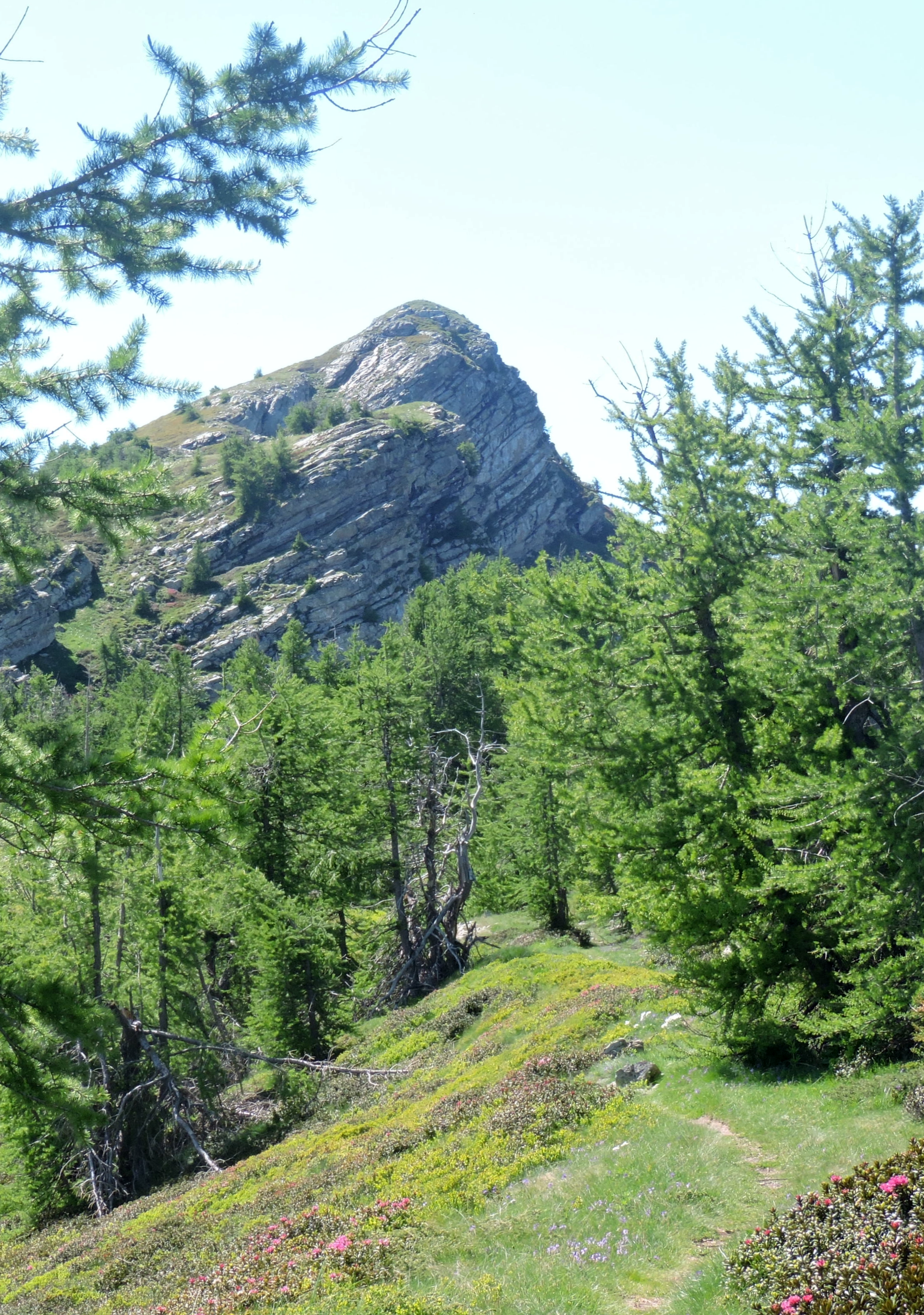

Highest point
- Elevation: 2,355 m (7,726 ft)
- Prominence: 183 m (600 ft)
- Coordinates: 44°06′00″N 7°41′43″E

Geography
- Location within Alps
- Location: Piemonte, Italy - Provence-Alpes-Côte d'Azur, France
- Parent range: Ligurian Alps

Climbing
- First ascent: ancestral
- Easiest route: footpath

The Cime de Mussun (French) or Cima Missun (Italian) is a mountain of the Ligurian Alps.

== History ==
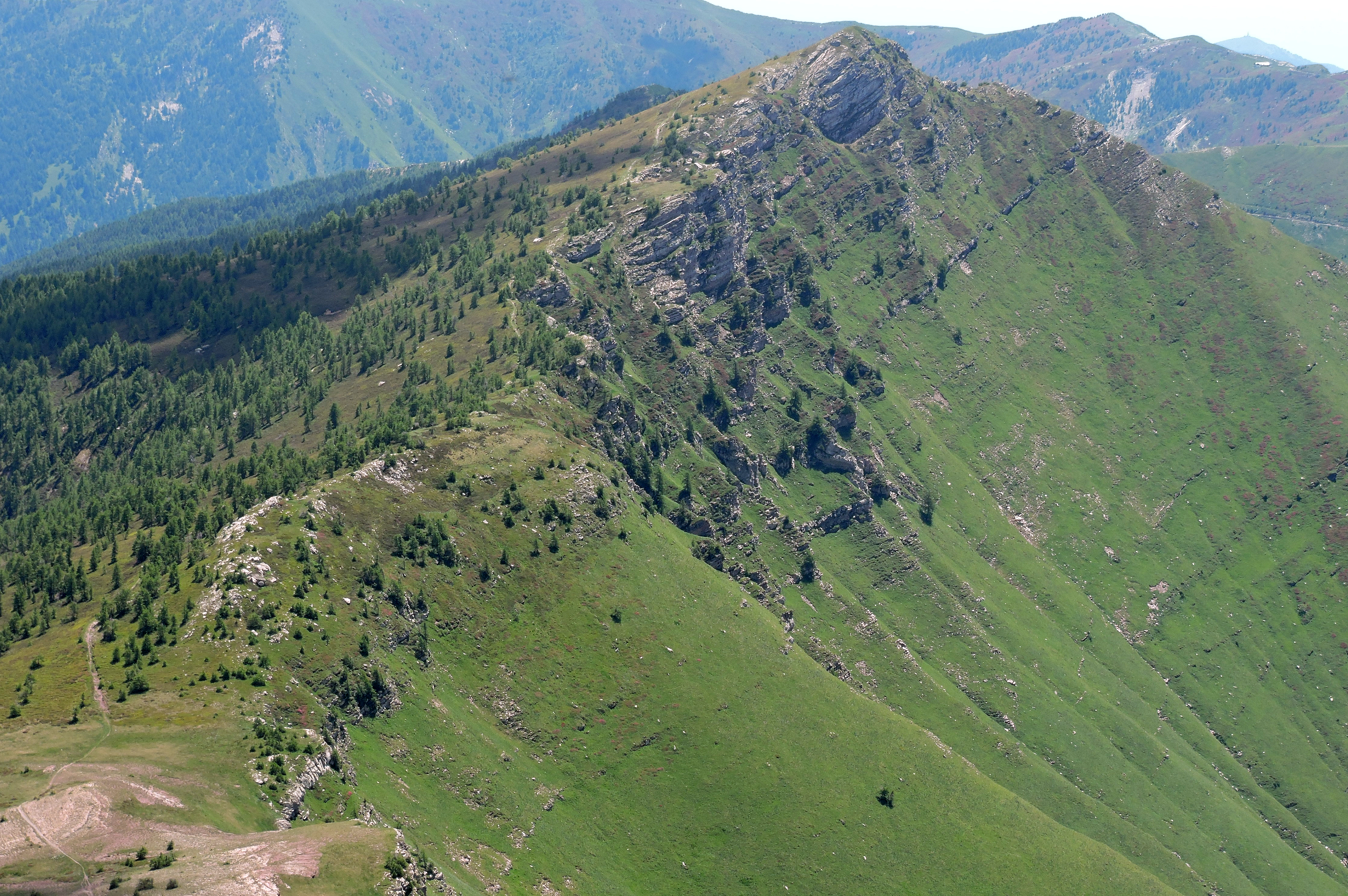
View from Monte Bertrand

The mountain up to World War II was totally belonging to Italy but, following the Paris Peace Treaties, signed in February 1947, is now shared between Italy and France.

== Geography ==
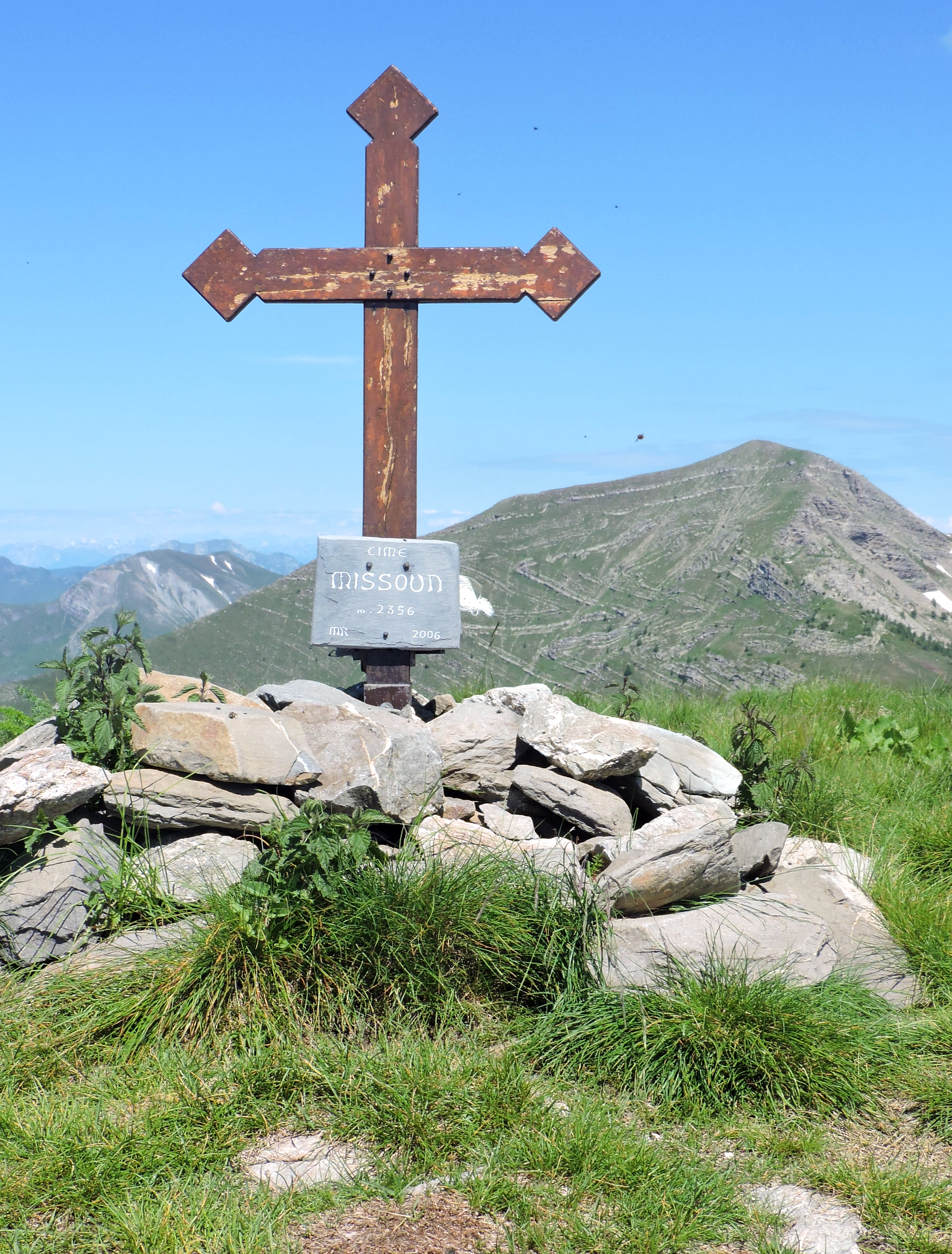
Summit cross

The mountain belongs to the Ligurian Alps and is located on the main chain of the Alps and on the water divide between che drainage basins of river Po (East) and Roya. Heading South the chain goes on with Punta Farenga and Cima Ventosa, while towards N-W it continues with the large saddle of Colla Rossa, which divides Cima Missun from Monte Bertrand. The summit, which is marked by a small cross, is located in France close to the French-Italian border, between Piemonte and Provence-Alpes-Côte d'Azur. Administratively the summit belongs to the French mairie of La Brigue. On the slopes facing Italy a former military mule-track runs across the mountainside, connecting Monesi with the colle di Tenda.

=== SOIUSA classification ===
According to the SOIUSA (International Standardized Mountain Subdivision of the Alps) the mountain can be classified in the following way:

- main part = Western Alps
- major sector = South Western Alps
- section = Ligurian Alps
- subsection = (It:Alpi del Marguareis/Fr:Alpes Liguriennes Occidentales)
- supergroup = (It:Catena del Saccarello /Fr:Chaîne du Mont Saccarel)
- group = (It:Gruppo del Monte Saccarello /Fr:Groupe du Mont Saccarel)
- subgroup = (It:Nodo del Monte Saccarello /Fr:Nœud du Mont Saccarel)
- code = I/A-1.II-A.1.a

== Hiking ==
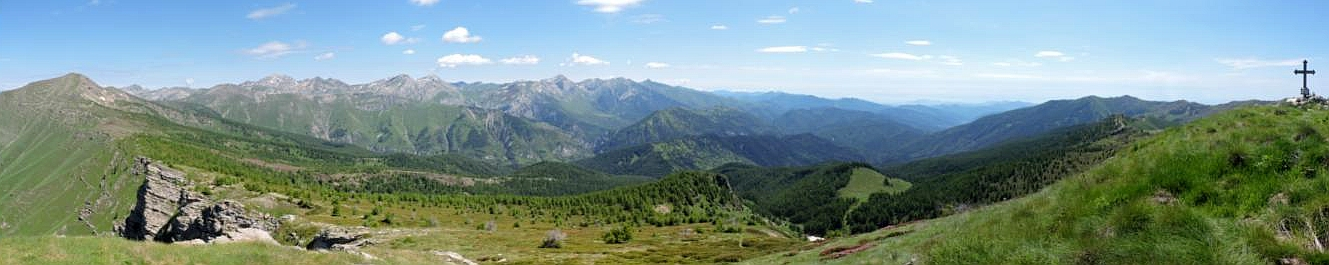
Panorama from the summit

The mountain is accessible from the Colla Rossa by a brief diversion branching from the former military dirt road which marks the border between Italy and France, which in this stretch coincides with an hiking itinerary named Alta via delle Alpi del Mare.

== Maps ==
- Cartografia ufficiale italiana in scala 1:25.000 e 1:100.000 (Map). Istituto Geografico Militare.
- Géoportail (French official maps) (Map). Institut géographique national.
- Carta in scala 1:50.000 n. 8 Alpi Marittime e Liguri (Map). Torino: Istituto Geografico Centrale.

== See also ==
Media related to Cime Missoun at Wikimedia Commons

- France–Italy border
