= Tanaro =

Italian river

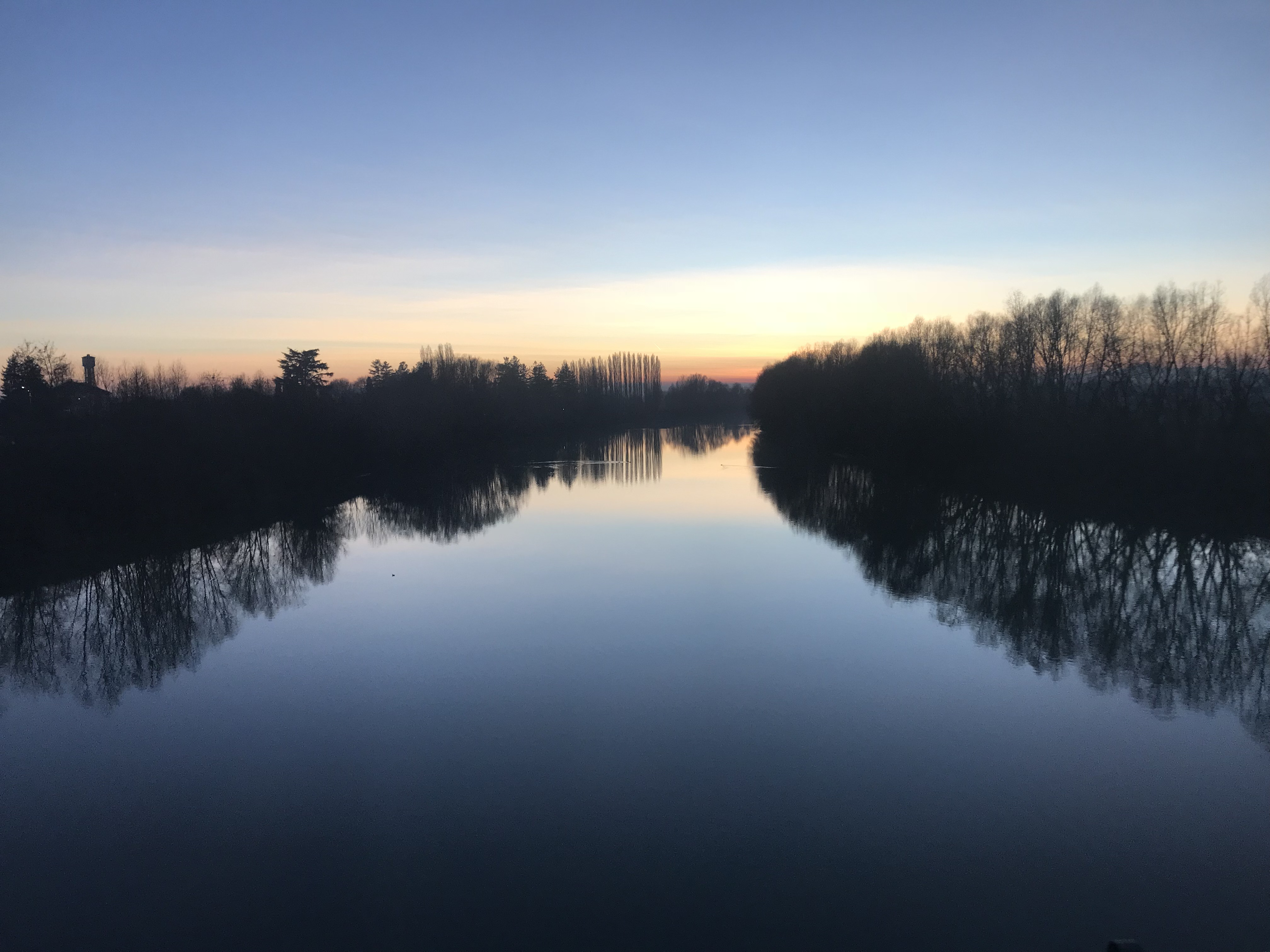
- Near Alessandria

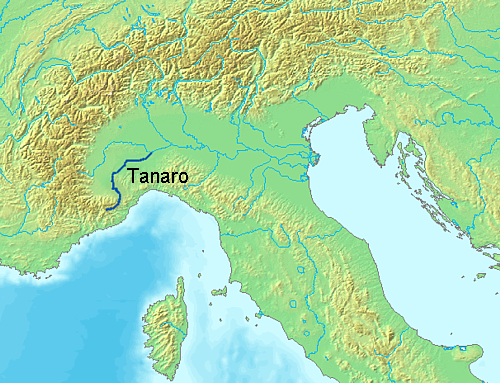
- Native name: Tane (Piedmontese)

Location
- Country: Italy

Physical characteristics
- Source
  - location: Ligurian Alps, on the slopes of Monte Saccarello
- Mouth
  - location: Po near Bassignana (AL)
  - coordinates: 45°00′20″N 8°46′10″E
- Length: 276 km (171 mi)
- Basin size: 8,234 km^{2} (3,179 mi^{2})
- Discharge
  - average: 123 m^{3}/s (4,300 cu ft/s)

Basin features
- Progression: Po→ Adriatic Sea
- Tributaries
  - left: Ellero, Stura di Demonte, Borbore, Versa
  - right: Belbo, Bormida

The Tanaro (Italian pronunciation: [ˈtaːnaro]; Piedmontese: Tane [ˈtɑne]; Ligurian: Tànau [ˈtana(ɹ)u]; Latin: Tanarus) is a 276-kilometre (171 mi) long river in northwestern Italy. The river begins in the Ligurian Alps, near the border with France, and is the most significant right-side tributary to the Po in terms of length, size of drainage basin (partly Alpine, partly Apennine), and discharge.

== Geography ==
=== Sources ===
The Tanaro rises at the border between Piedmont and Liguria at the confluence of two smaller streams: the Tanarello and the Negrone.

The main source of the Tanarello is on the slopes of Monte Saccarello above Monesi, a village belonging to the commune of Triora. This mountain straddles the French département of Alpes-Maritimes, the Piedmontese province of Cuneo and the Ligurian province of Imperia and marks the juncture of the watersheds between three drainage basins: the Tanaro itself; the Roya (Italian: Roia), which rises in France but enters the sea at Ventimiglia; and the Argentina, which flows into the Ligurian Sea at Taggia.

The sources of the Negrone are not far from Punta Marguareis and very close to the French border.

=== Course ===
The Tanaro flows through the towns of Ormea, Garessio, Ceva, Alba, Asti, and Alessandria before flowing into Po river near Bassignana in the Province of Alessandria. At its confluence with the Po, the Tanaro is about 50 km longer than the upper Po, a case similar to the famous Missouri tributary being longer than Mississippi in the United States.

=== Tributaries ===
The main tributaries to the Tanaro are the Stura di Demonte, the Pesio, the Ellero and the Borbore from the left and the Bormida and the Belbo from the right.

== Regime ==
The flow is subject to a great seasonal variation. Although the river has an Alpine origin, which is unique among the Po’s right-side tributaries, the Ligurian Alps are of an insufficient elevation and too close to the sea to allow for the formation of snow fields or glaciers large enough to provide a steady source of water during the summer. Furthermore, the Alpine zone forms only a part of the basin drained by the Tanaro. The seasonal regime of the river is therefore more typical of an Apennine stream, with a maximum discharge that can reach 1,700 cubic metres per second (60,000 cu ft/s), in spring and autumn and a very low rate of flow in the summer.

== Flood events ==
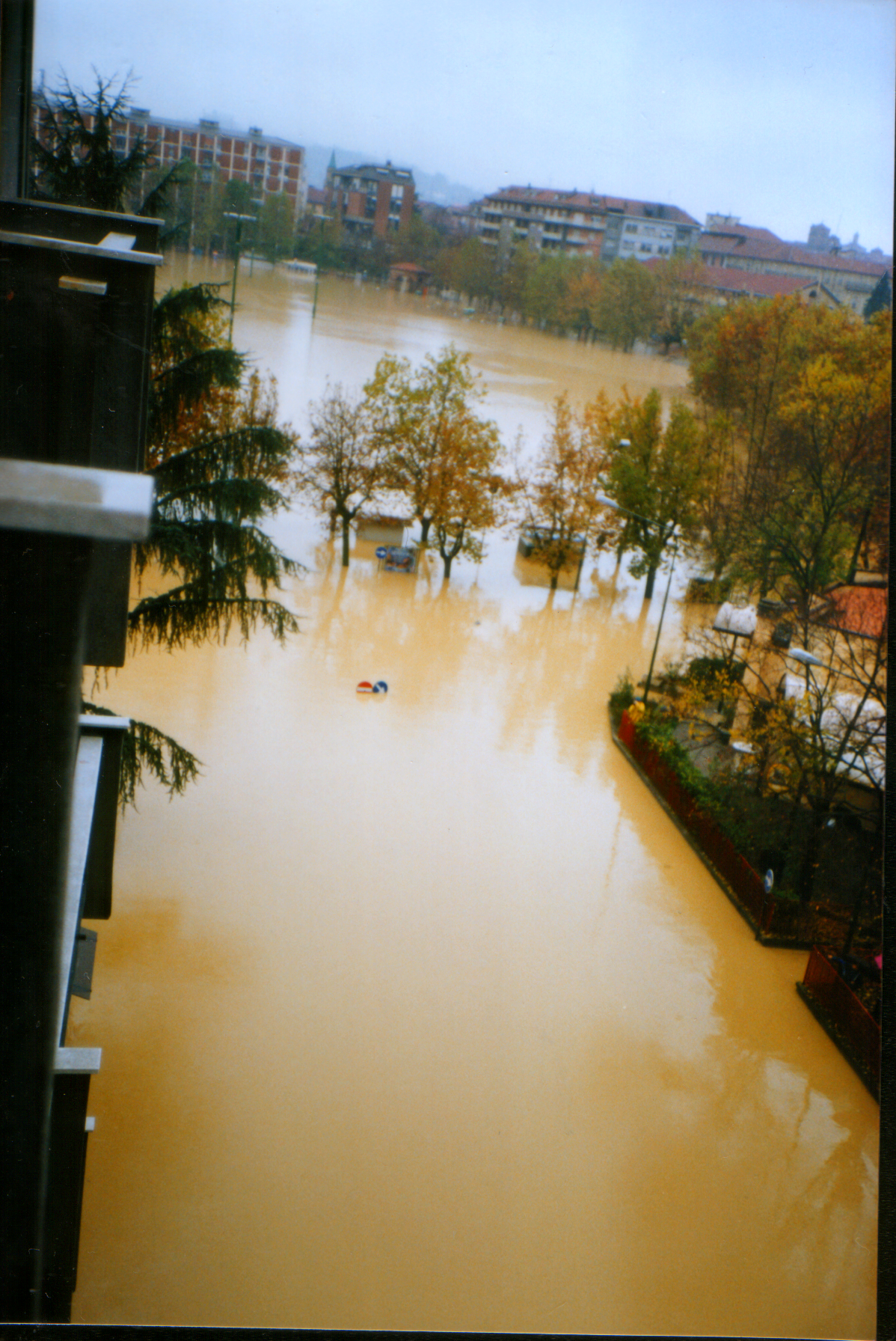
1994 floods in Asti

The river is highly prone to flooding. During the two-hundred-year period between 1801 and 2001, sections of the Tanaro basin were affected by floods on 136 occasions. The most devastating floods were in November 1994, November 2016, October 2020, when the whole valley was affected by severe flooding.

== History ==
The left bank of the Tanaro River near Asti is the scene of the Battle of Pollentia on April 6, 402.

== See also ==
- List of rivers of Italy
