= Briga Alta =

- Comune
- Comune di Briga Alta
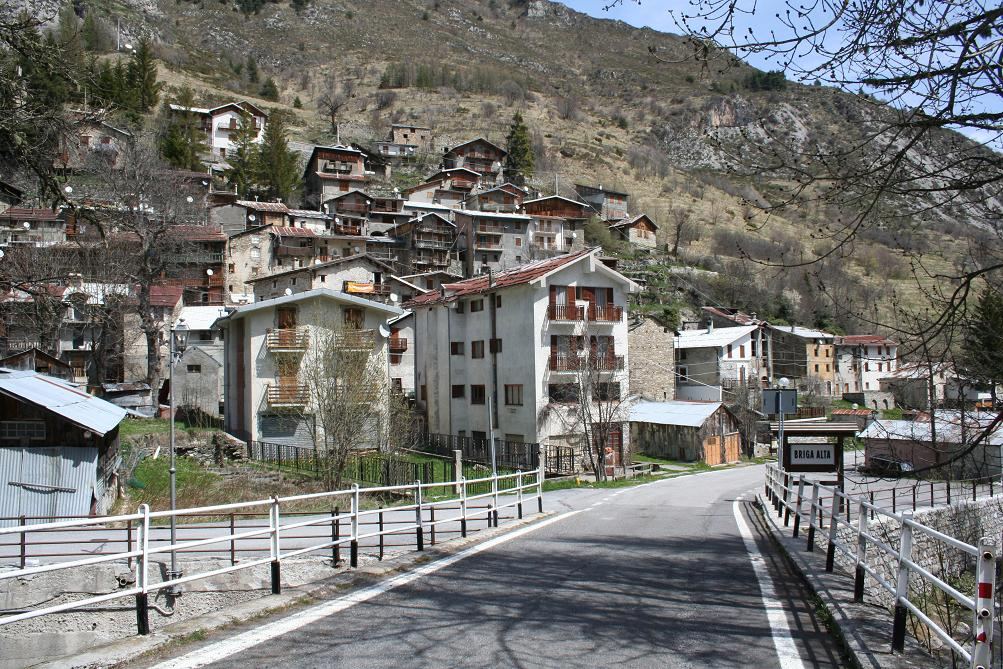
- Upega

- Coat of arms

- Location within Italy Location within Piedmont
- Coordinates: 44°05′N 7°45′E
- Country: Italy
- Region: Piedmont
- Province: Cuneo (CN)
- Frazioni: Carnino, Piaggia, Upega

Government
  - Mayor: Ivo Alberti (Civic List)

Area
  - Total: 52.18 km^{2} (20.15 sq mi)

Population (2026)
  - Total: 41
  - Density: 0.79/km^{2} (2.0/sq mi)
- Demonym: Brigaschi
- Time zone: UTC+1 (CET)
  - Summer (DST): UTC+2 (CEST)
- Postal code: 18025
- Dialing code: 0174

Briga Alta is a comune (municipality) in the Province of Cuneo in the region of Piedmont in Italy. With a population of 41 in an area of 52.18 square kilometres (20.15 sq mi), it is the least densely populated municipality in Italy.

== Geography ==
The village is located about 80 kilometres (50 mi) south of Turin and about 13 kilometres (8 mi) southeast of Cuneo, on the border with France.

Briga Alta is made up of the frazioni of Carnino, Piaggia (the seat of the municipality), and Upega, and borders the municipalities of Chiusa di Pesio, Cosio di Arroscia, La Brigue (France), Limone Piemonte, Mendatica, Ormea, Roccaforte Mondovì, Tende (France), and Triora.

== Demographics ==
As of 2026, the population is 41, of which 61.0% are male, and 39.0% are female. Minors make up 9.8% of the population, and seniors make up 19.5%.

Historical population

Year	Pop.	±%
1861	1,291	—
1871	1,361	+5.4%
1881	713	−47.6%
1901	545	−23.6%
1911	776	+42.4%
1921	679	−12.5%
1931	418	−38.4%
1936	379	−9.3%

Year	Pop.	±%
1951	285	−24.8%
1961	225	−21.1%
1971	161	−28.4%
1981	120	−25.5%
1991	81	−32.5%
2001	62	−23.5%
2011	48	−22.6%
2021	40	−16.7%

Source: ISTAT

=== Immigration ===
As of 2025, immigrants make up 2.5% of the total population. The foreign country of birth is France.

== See also ==
- Passo Tanarello
