= Bric Costa Rossa =

Mountain in Italy

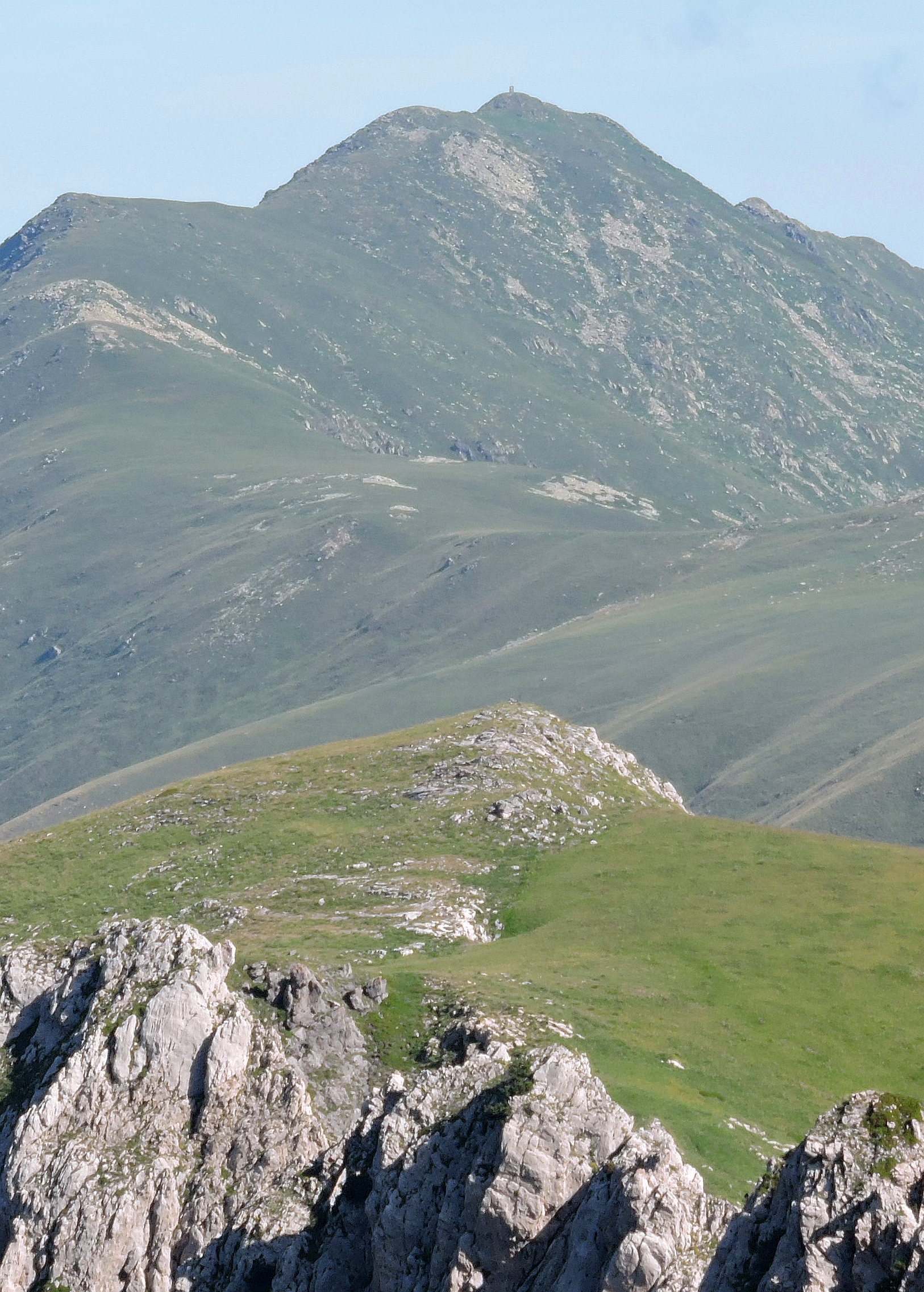
- View of the mountain from colle del Cros

Highest point
- Elevation: 2,403 m (7,884 ft)
- Prominence: 349 m (1,145 ft)
- Listing: Alpine mountains 2000-2499 m
- Coordinates: 44°15′02″N 7°36′00″E

Geography
- Location within Alps
- Location: Piemonte, Italy
- Parent range: Ligurian Alps

Climbing
- First ascent: ancestral
- Easiest route: waymarked footpath

The Bric Costa Rossa is a mountain of the Ligurian Alps located in Piedmont (NW Italy).

== Etymology ==
In Piedmontese Bric means mountain or hill, while Costa Rossa con be translated from the Italian as red slope.

== Geography ==
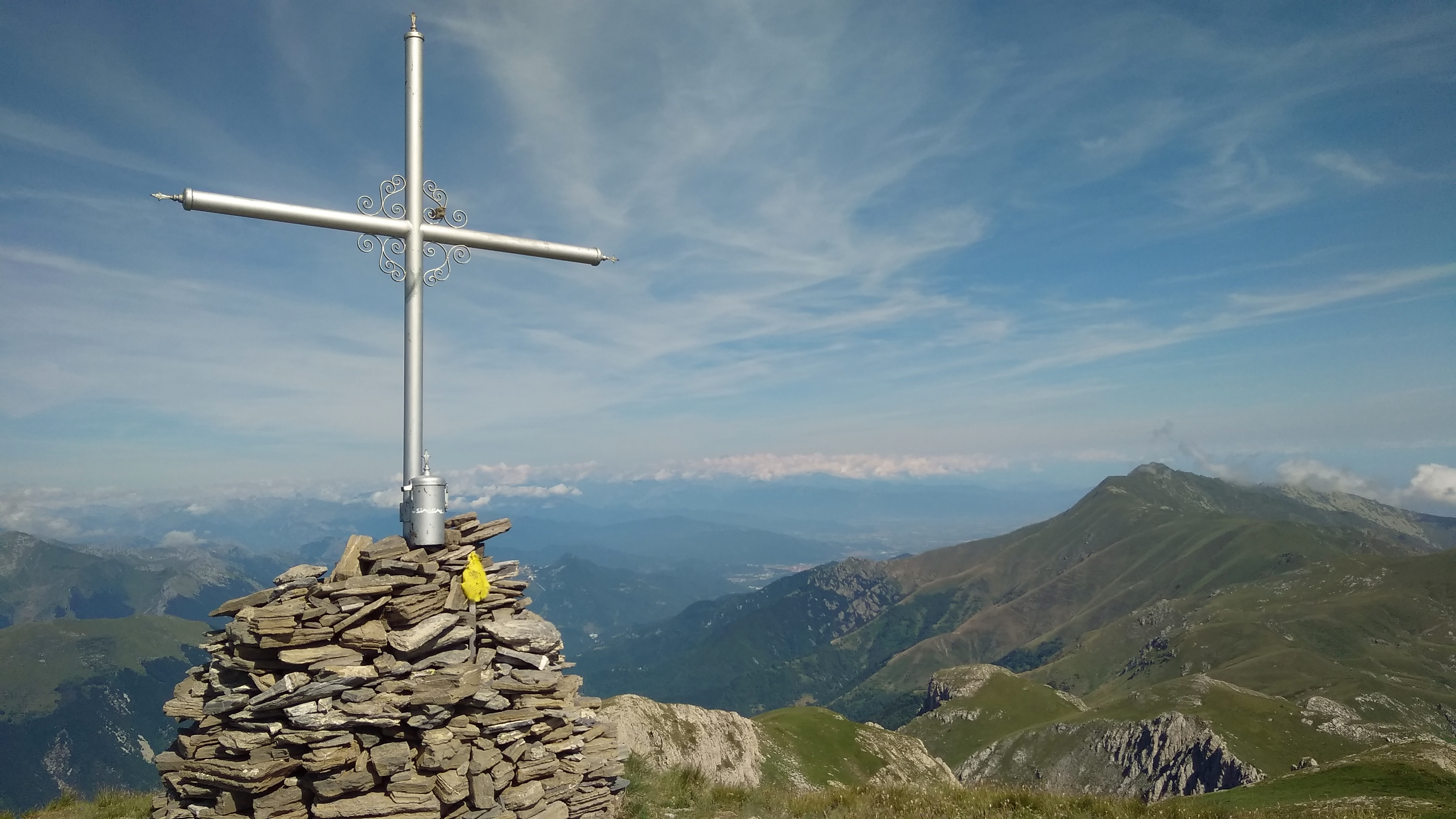
Bric Costa Rossa as seen from Cima della Fascia

The mountain stands on the ridge dividing the valleys of Vermenagna and Pesio. Southwards the water divide continues heading to the Punta Mirauda and Cima della Fascia while northwards it connects Bric Costa Rossa with the Bisalta (2,231 m). On some books Bisalta refers not just to this summit but to a small massif whose highest elevation is the Bric Costa Rossa.

=== SOIUSA classification ===
According to the SOIUSA (International Standardized Mountain Subdivision of the Alps) the mountain can be classified in the following way:

- main part = Western Alps
- major sector = South Western Alps
- section = Ligurian Alps
- subsection = (It:Alpi del Marguareis/Fr:Alpes Liguriennes Occidentales)
- supergroup = (It:Catena Marguareis-Mongioie/Fr:Chaîne Marguareis-Mongioie)
- group = (It:Gruppo Testa Ciaudon-Cima della Fascia)
- subgroup = (It:Costiera del Bric Costa Rossa)
- code = I/A-1.II-B.3.d

== Access to the summit ==
The Bric Costa Rossa can be reached by a waymarked footpath which follows the ridge connecting it to the Bisalta. Another hiking route to climb the summit starts from Casali Giachet (a village belonging to the comune of Limone Piemonte).

The mountain is also accessible in winter by ski mountaineers.

== Maps ==
- Cartografia ufficiale italiana in scala 1:25.000 e 1:100.000 (Map). Istituto Geografico Militare.
- Carta in scala 1:50.000 n. 8 Alpi Marittime e Liguri (Map). Torino: Istituto Geografico Centrale.
