= Mount Testa Ciaudon =

Mountain in the Ligurian Alps

Testa Ciaudon
- Tête Chaudon (in French)
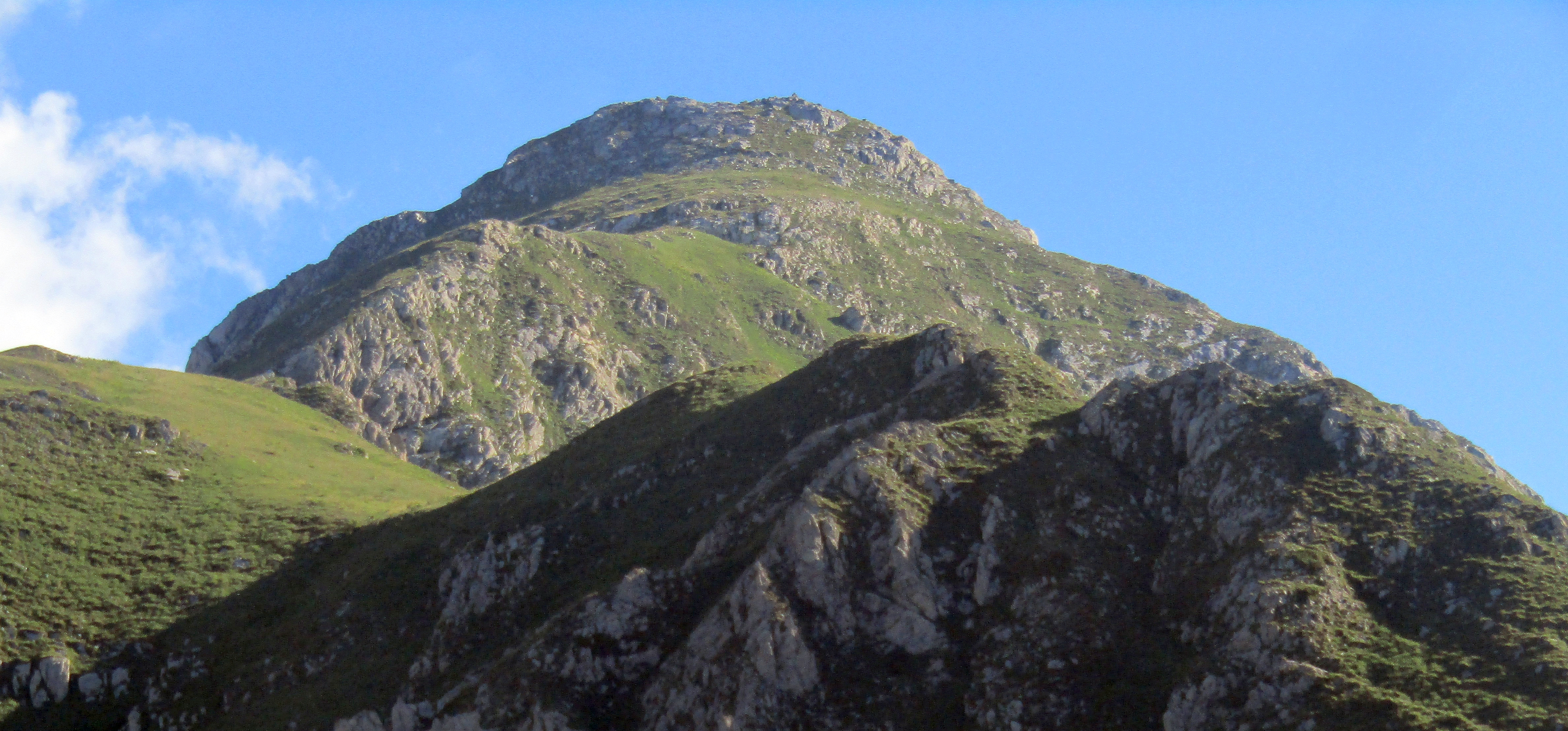
- Southern ridge

Highest point
- Elevation: 2,386 m (7,828 ft)
- Prominence: 74 m (243 ft)
- Coordinates: 44.10°N 7.37°E

Geography
- Location: Province of Cuneo - Alpes-Maritimes, Piedmont - Provence-Alpes-Côte d'Azur, Italy - France
- Parent range: Alps

The Testa Ciaudon (French: Tête Chaudon) is a mountain in the Ligurian Alps with an elevation of 2,386 metres (7,828 ft).

== History ==
The mountain, which once belonged entirely to Italy, is now located on the border with France. The Treaty of Paris established the border between the two countries along the Po Valley/Ligurian ridge.

== Description ==
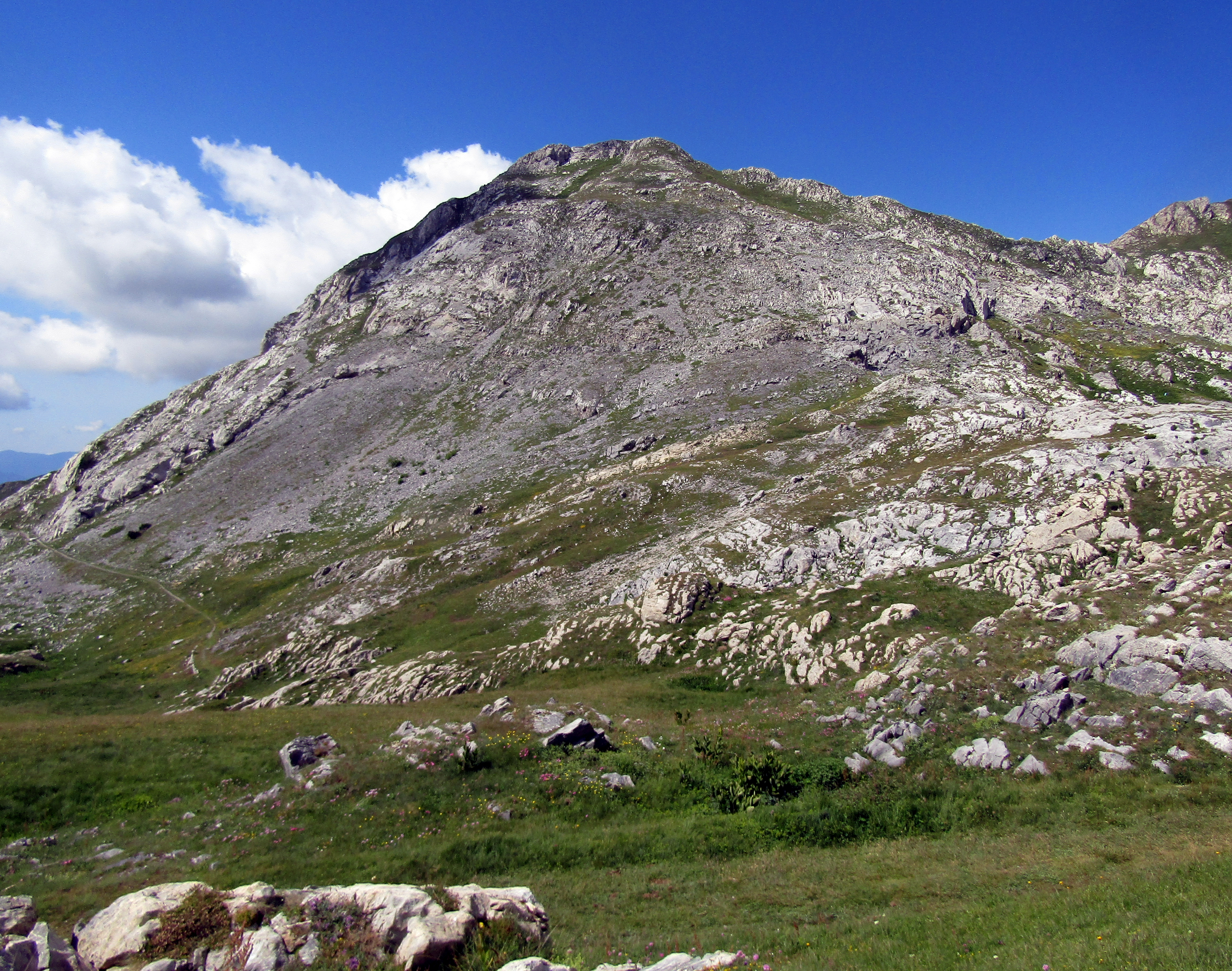
East side

Testa Ciaudon is part of the main Alpine chain and lies on the watershed dividing the Tanaro River basin to the east from the Roia Valley to the west. The mountain forms a key orographic node, as it is the point from which the long coastal ridge separating the Vermenagna Valley (west) and the Pesio Valley (east) branches off from the primary Alpine watershed.

To the north of Testa Ciaudon, beyond the saddle known as Colla Malaberga (also Colla Malabera, 2,312 m), the ridge ascends to Punta San Salvatore and continues, after a shallow depression, to Cima della Fascia. Along the Po–Ligurian divide, the mountain is flanked by two significant saddles: Boaria Pass to the west, and Colla Piana di Malaberga (2,219 m) to the east. The latter connects to Punta Straldi and Punta Marguareis, and lies near Capanna Morgantini, a mountain refuge serving primarily speleologists. In the SOIUSA (International Standardized Mountain Subdivision of the Alps), Testa Ciaudon lends its name to the Nodo della Testa Ciaudon, a recognized subgroup within the Ligurian Alps.

The summit, which provides wide-ranging panoramic views of the surrounding peaks and valleys, is marked by a boundary stone. A large stone cairn is located a short distance from the summit. The mountain has a topographical prominence of 74 metres, calculated as the elevation difference between the summit (2,386 m) and the Colla di Malaberga (2,312 m), its key col.

== Geology ==
The area surrounding Testa Ciaudon is characterized by karstic terrain, shaped by the dissolution of soluble rocks such as limestone. The geological formations in the region date back to the Mesozoic era, indicating that the area developed between approximately 252 and 66 million years ago.

== Access to the summit ==
The summit of Testa Ciaudon can be reached by a short hiking trail that begins at Colla Piana, passes through Colla di Malaberga, and continues along the mountain's northern ridge. Colla Piana is accessible via the former Limone–Monesi military road, which connects Col de Tende with Monesi di Triora.

The mountain is also a popular destination for ski mountaineering during the winter and spring months, as well as for snowshoeing. However, such activities should only be undertaken under stable snow conditions and with appropriate avalanche precautions.

== Nature protection ==
The eastern slopes of Testa Ciaudon, overlooking Val Pesio, lie within the boundaries of the Natural Park of Marguareis, a protected area established to conserve the region's alpine flora, fauna, and karst landscapes.

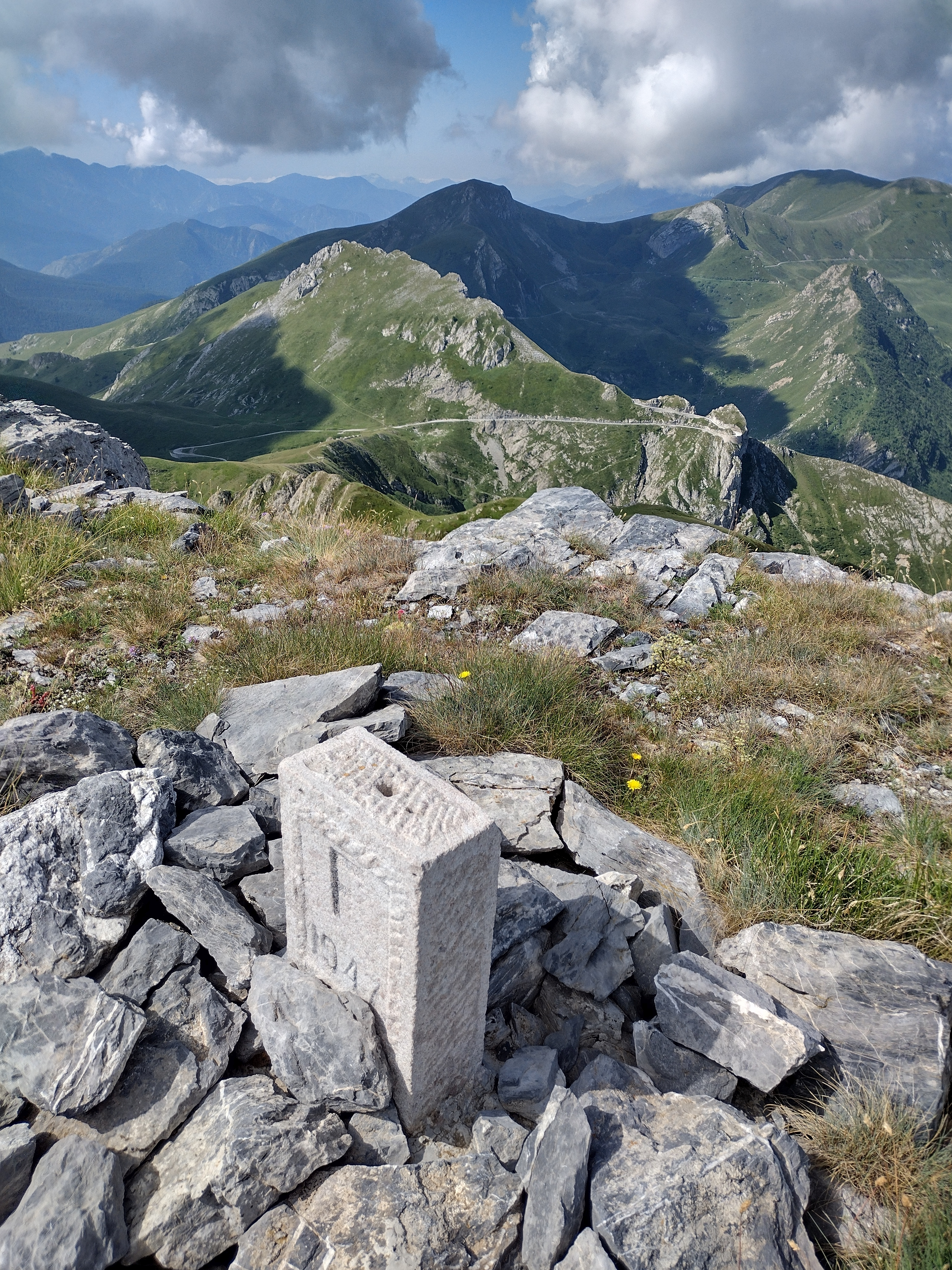
Boundary stone on the summit

== Bibliography ==
- Marazzi, Sergio (2005). Atlante Orografico delle Alpi. SOIUSA [Orographic Atlas of the Alps. SOIUSA] (in Italian). Pavone Canavese: Priuli & Verlucca. ISBN 9788880682738.
- Montagna, Euro; Montaldo, Lorenzo (1981). Alpi Liguri, collana Guida dei Monti d'Italia, CAI-TCI [Alpi Liguri, series Guida dei Monti d'Italia, CAI-TCI] (in Italian). Touring. ISBN 9788836500796.

=== Cartography ===
- Istituto Geografico Militare. "Cartografia ufficiale italiana in scala 1:25.000 e 1:100.000" [Official Italian maps at a scale of 1:25,000 and 1:100,000]. pcn.minambiente.it (in Italian).
- Institut national de l'information géographique et forestière. "Cartografia ufficiale francese" [Official French cartography]. geoportail.gouv.fr (in Italian).
- Natural Park of Marguareis. Carta dei sentieri e stradale scala 1:25.000 n. 16 Val Vermenagna Valle Pesio Alta val Ellero Parco naturale del Marguareis [Trail and road map, scale 1:25,000, no. 16 Val Vermenagna, Pesio Valley, Upper Ellero Valley, Marguareis Natural Park] (in Italian). Ciriè: Fraternali editore. ISBN 9788897465140.
- Istituto Geografico Centrale. Carta in scala 1:50.000 n. 8 Alpi Marittime e Liguri [1:50,000 scale map no. 8 Maritime Alps and Ligurian Alps] (in Italian). Torino.
