= Punta Mirauda =

Mountain in Italy

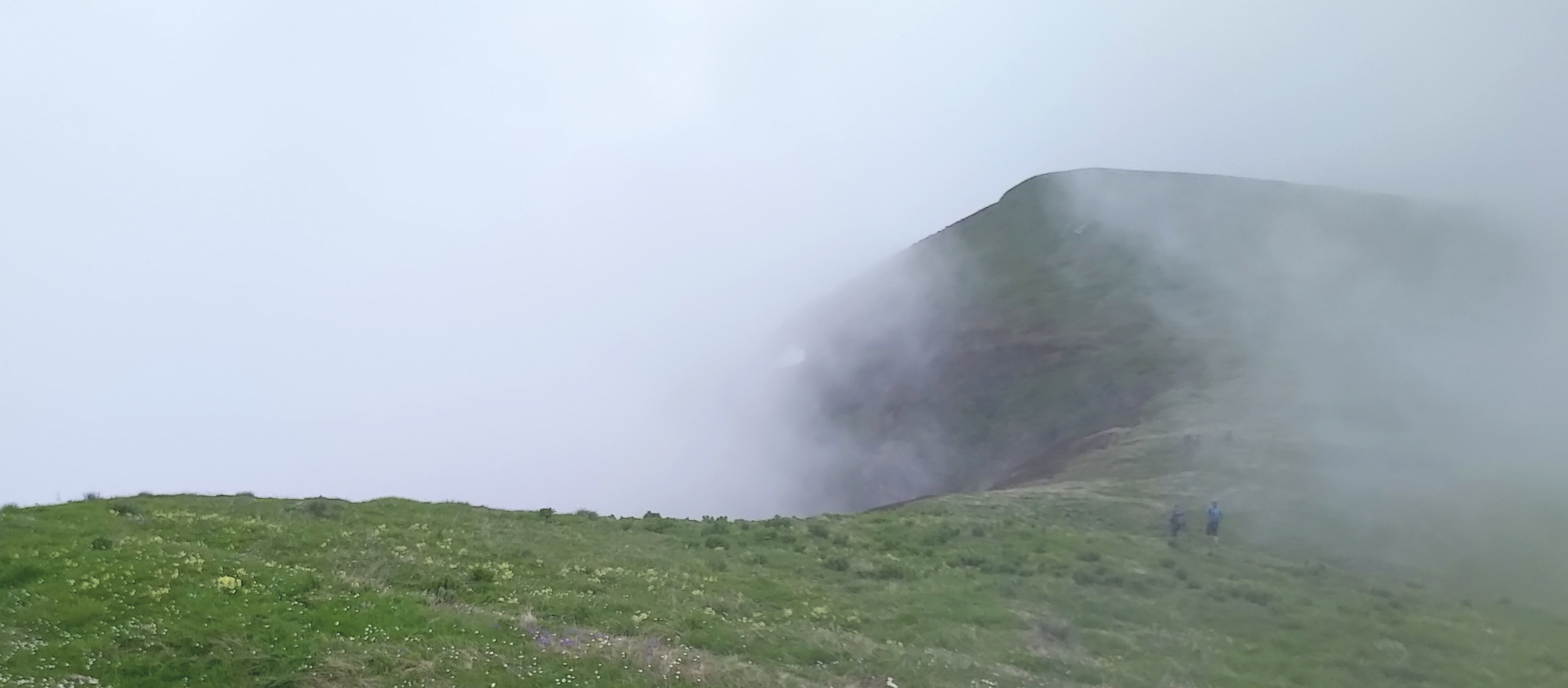
- The summit from Punta Agugion in a foggy day

Highest point
- Elevation: 2,157 m (7,077 ft)
- Prominence: 77 m (253 ft)
- Coordinates: 44°13′13″N 7°37′29″E

Geography
- Location within Alps
- Location: Piemonte, Italy
- Parent range: Ligurian Alps

Climbing
- First ascent: ancestral
- Easiest route: hiking

The Punta Mirauda is a mountain of the Ligurian Alps located in Piedmont (NW Italy).

== Toponymy ==
Mirauda is a regional name used in Piedmont for the green whip snake.

== Geography ==
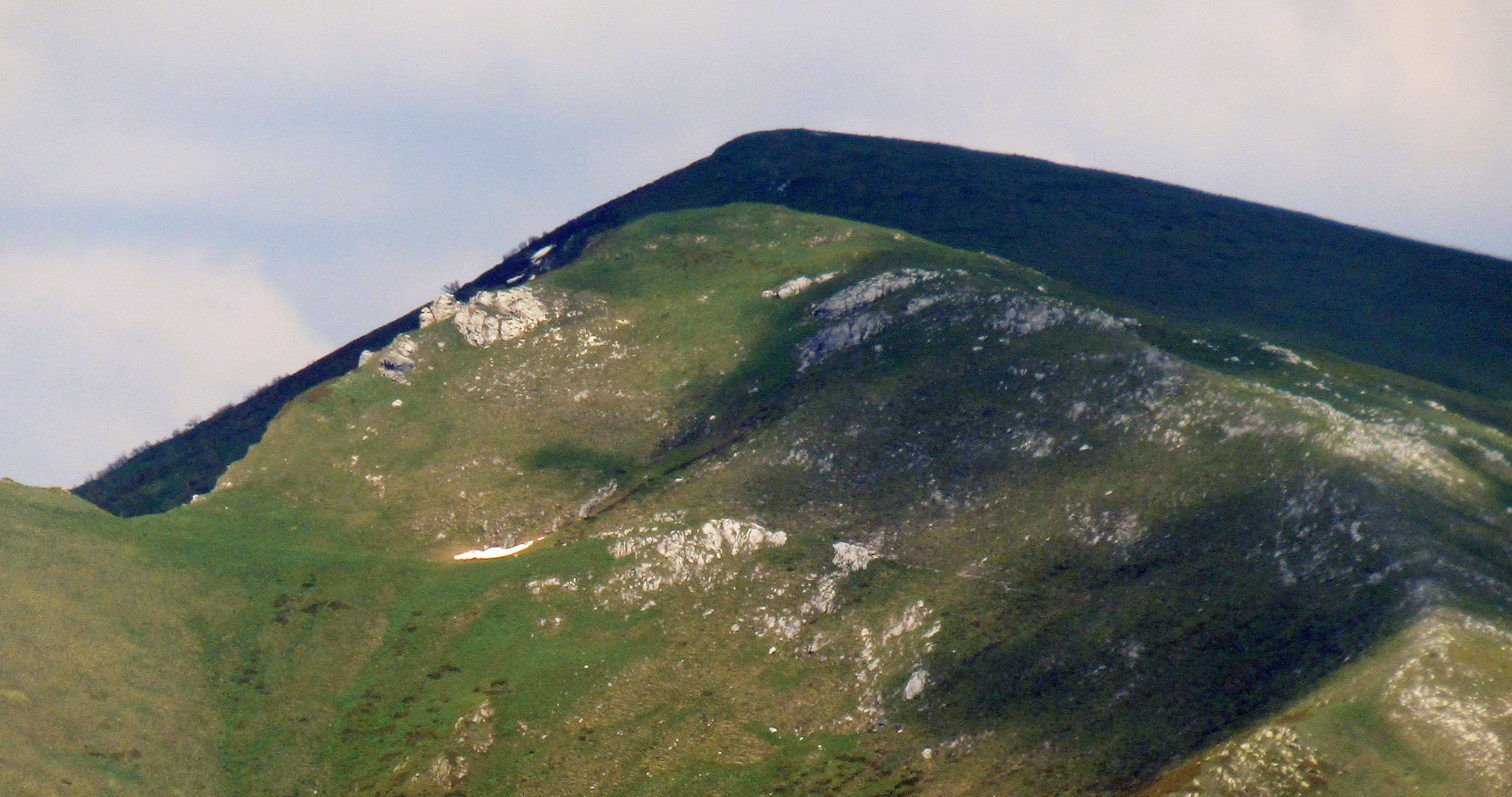
Punta Mirauda in the shade behind the Punta Agugion

The mountain stands on the ridge dividing the valleys of Vermenagna and Pesio. Southwards of the summit the water divide lowers with Colla Vaccarile (2.050 m) after which stand the Monte Jurin and the Cima della Fascia. In the opposite direction, after Il Colletto (2.080 m), the ridge goes on with the Bric Costa Rossa and the Bisalta. From the Punta Mirauda starts a third ridge which, heading SW, divides the Vallone Sottana from the Valle Almellina, two tributaries of the main Vermenagna Valley. A last ridge heads E towards the centre of the Pesio valley, linking Punta Mirauda with the Labiaia Mirauda (1.971 m), a mountain that overlooks Pian della Gorre. The prominence of Punta Mirauda is 77 m, its key col being the Colletto (2.080 m). The summit of the mountain is flanked by a subsummit named Punta Agugion (2.133 m).

=== SOIUSA classification ===
According to the SOIUSA (International Standardized Mountain Subdivision of the Alps) the mountain can be classified in the following way:

- main part = Western Alps
- major sector = South Western Alps
- section = Ligurian Alps
- subsection = It:Alpi del Marguareis/Fr:Alpes Liguriennes Occidentales
- supergroup = It:Catena Marguareis-Mongioie/Fr:Chaîne Marguareis-Mongioie
- group = It:Gruppo Testa Ciaudon-Punta Mirauda
- subgroup = It:Dorsale della Punta Mirauda
- code = I/A-1.II-B.3.b

== Geology ==
The mountain stands in a karstic area. A huge network of natural tunnels, which collects underground water reaching the aquifer through many fractures and ponors, takes its name from Punta Mirauda.

== Access to the summit ==
The Punta Mirauda can be reached from Limone Piemonte (Casali Barat village) with an easy hiking itinerary, or from the Pesio valley, starting in this case from Pian delle Gorre.

The mountain is also a ski mountaineering destination.

== Conservation ==
The eastern slopes of the mountain, facing the Pesio Valley, are part of the Natural Park of Marguareis, a nature reserve established by Regione Piemonte.

== Bibliography ==
- Sergio Marazzi, Atlante Orografico delle Alpi. SOIUSA. Pavone Canavese (TO), Priuli & Verlucca editori, 2005.
- Montagna, Euro; Montaldo, Lorenzo (1981). Alpi Liguri. Guida dei Monti d'Italia (in Italian). CAI-TCI.

== Maps ==
- Cartografia ufficiale italiana in scala 1:25.000 e 1:100.000 (Map). Istituto Geografico Militare.
- Carta in scala 1:50.000 n. 8 Alpi Marittime e Liguri (Map). Torino: Istituto Geografico Centrale.
- 1:25.000 map nr.16 "Val Vermenagna Valle Pesio Alta val Ellero Parco naturale del Marguareis" (Map). Ciriè: Fraternali.

Media related to Punta Mirauda at Wikimedia Commons
