= Cima della Fascia =

Mountain in Italy

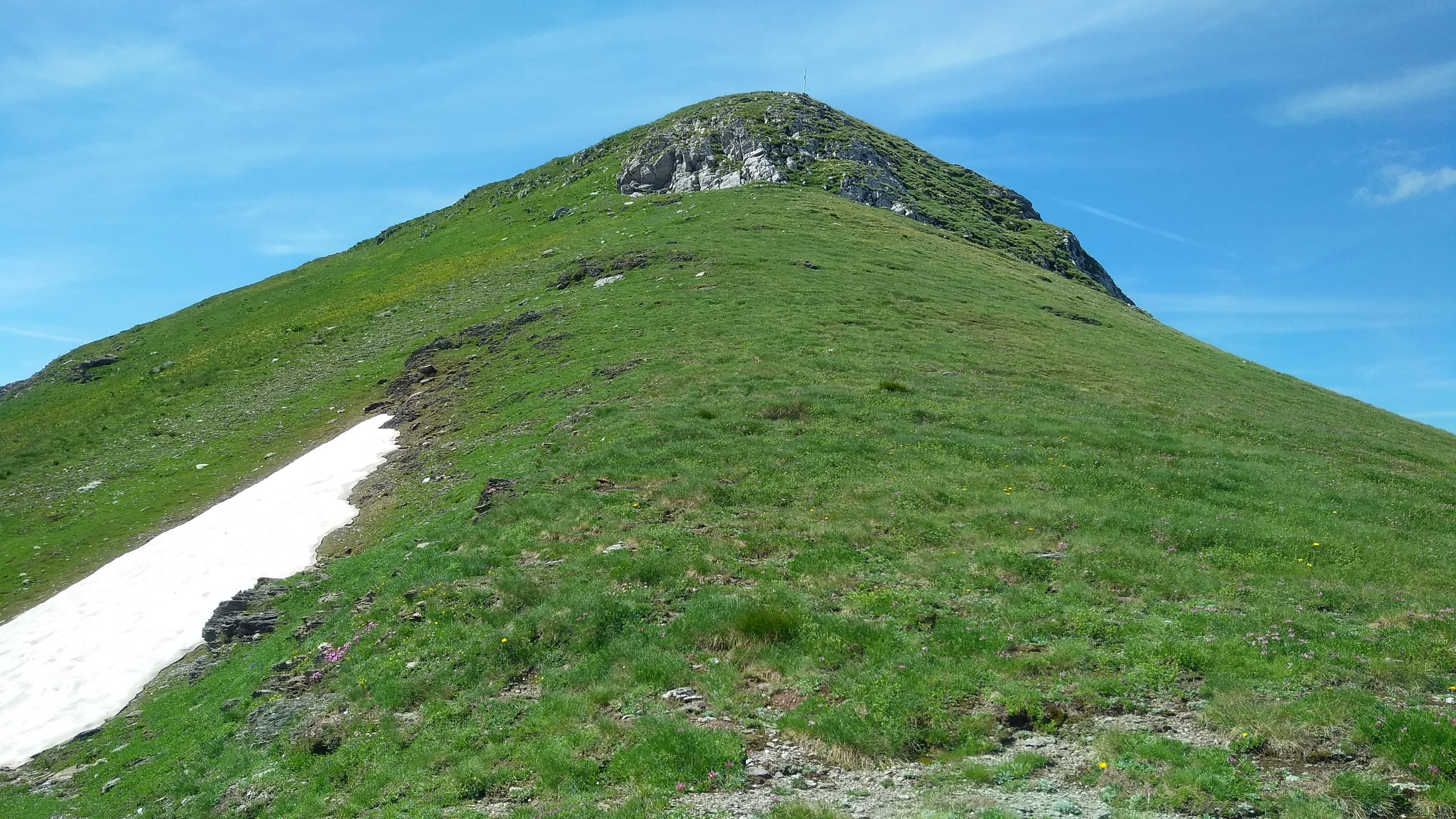
- The summit as seen from its N shoulder

Highest point
- Elevation: 2,495 m (8,186 ft)
- Prominence: 276 m (906 ft)
- Coordinates: 44°16′12″N 7°36′21″E

Geography
- Location within Alps
- Location: Piemonte, Italy
- Parent range: Ligurian Alps

Climbing
- First ascent: ancestral
- Easiest route: hiking

The Cima della Fascia is a mountain of the Ligurian Alps located in Piedmont (NW Italy).

== Geography ==
The mountain stands on the ridge dividing the valleys of Vermenagna and Pesio. Southwards the water divide continues heading to the Punta Mirauda and Bric Costa Rossa, while northwards in connects Cima della Fascia with the main chain of the Alps. The summit, which offers a very vast panorama, is marked by a cairn bearing a metallic summit cross; in the base of the cairn a box contains the summit register.

=== SOIUSA classification ===
According to the SOIUSA (International Standardized Mountain Subdivision of the Alps) the mountain can be classified in the following way:

- main part = Western Alps
- major sector = South Western Alps
- section = Ligurian Alps
- subsection = It:Alpi del Marguareis/Fr:Alpes Liguriennes Occidentales
- supergroup = It:Catena Marguareis-Mongioie/Fr:Chaîne Marguareis-Mongioie
- group = It:Gruppo Testa Ciaudon-Cima della Fascia
- subgroup = It:Dorsale della Cima della Fascia
- code = I/A-1.II-B.3.b

== Geology ==
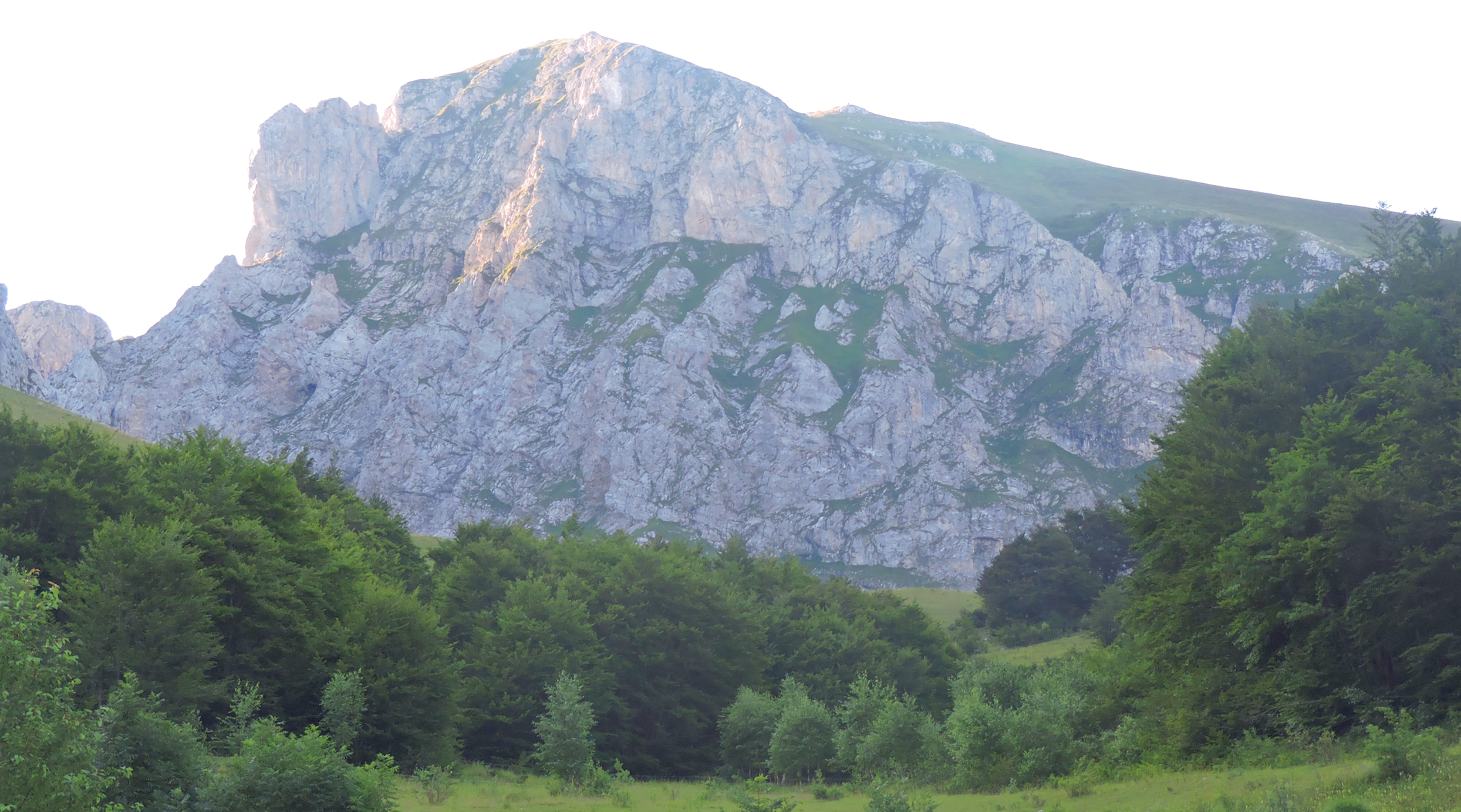
Karstic cliffs facing the Vallone del Cros

The mountain stands in a karstic area. Its basement is mainly formed of Triassic limestone, the intermediate portion of younger limestone, of Jurassic origin, and the summit of layers of Eocenic schists.

== Conservation ==
The eastern slopes of the mountain, facing the Pesio Valley, are part of the Natural Park of Marguareis, a nature reserve established by Regione Piemonte.

== Access to the summit ==
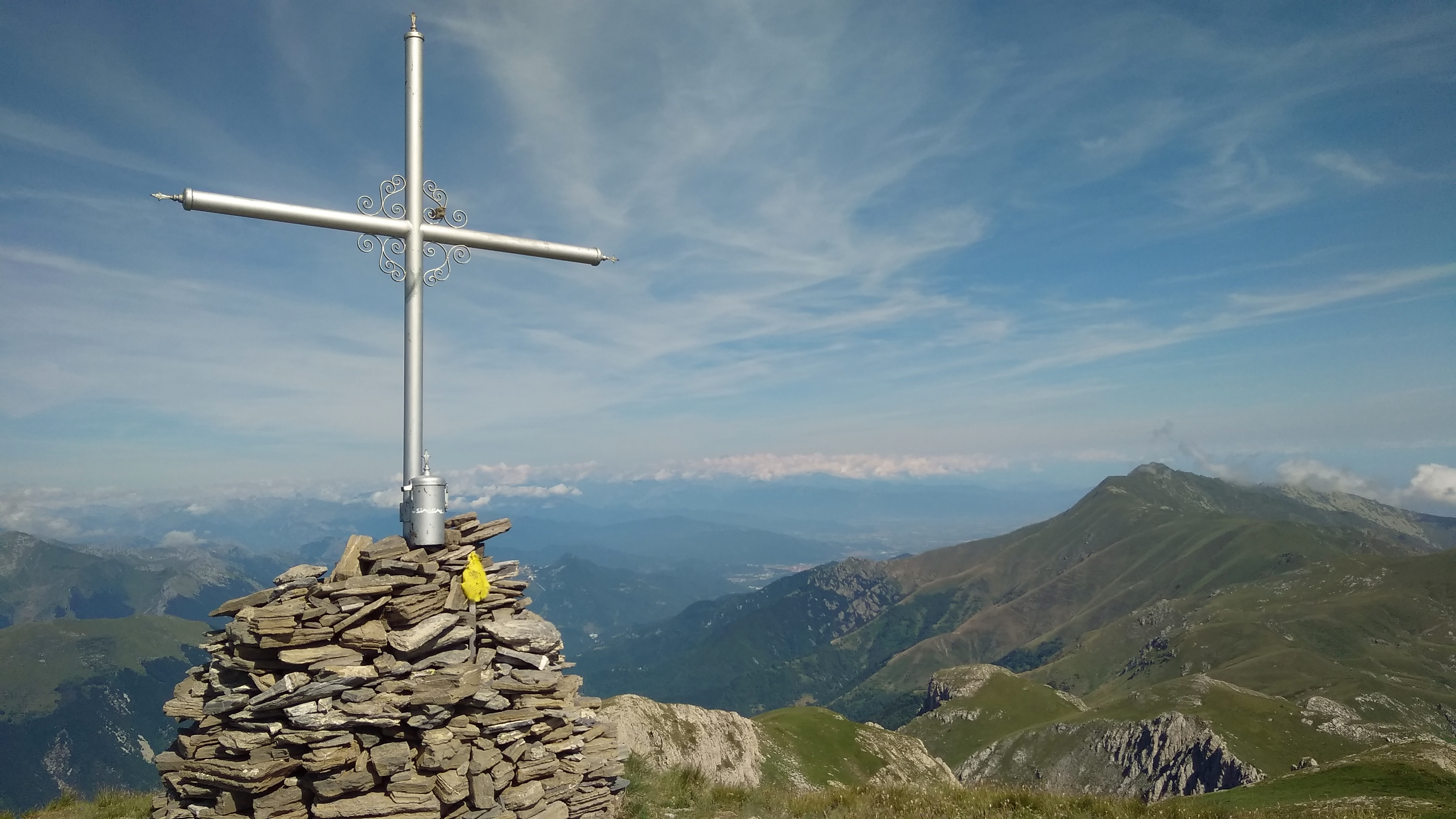
Cima della Fascia summit cross, on its right the Bric Costa Rossa

The Cima della Fascia can be reached hiking from Limone Piemonte. The mountain is also accessible in winter by ski mountaineers, with quite a demanding itinerary.

== Maps ==
- Cartografia ufficiale italiana in scala 1:25.000 e 1:100.000 (Map). Istituto Geografico Militare.
- Carta in scala 1:50.000 n. 8 Alpi Marittime e Liguri (Map). Torino: Istituto Geografico Centrale.
