= Cime de Pépin =

Mountain in the French alps

- Mont Pepino
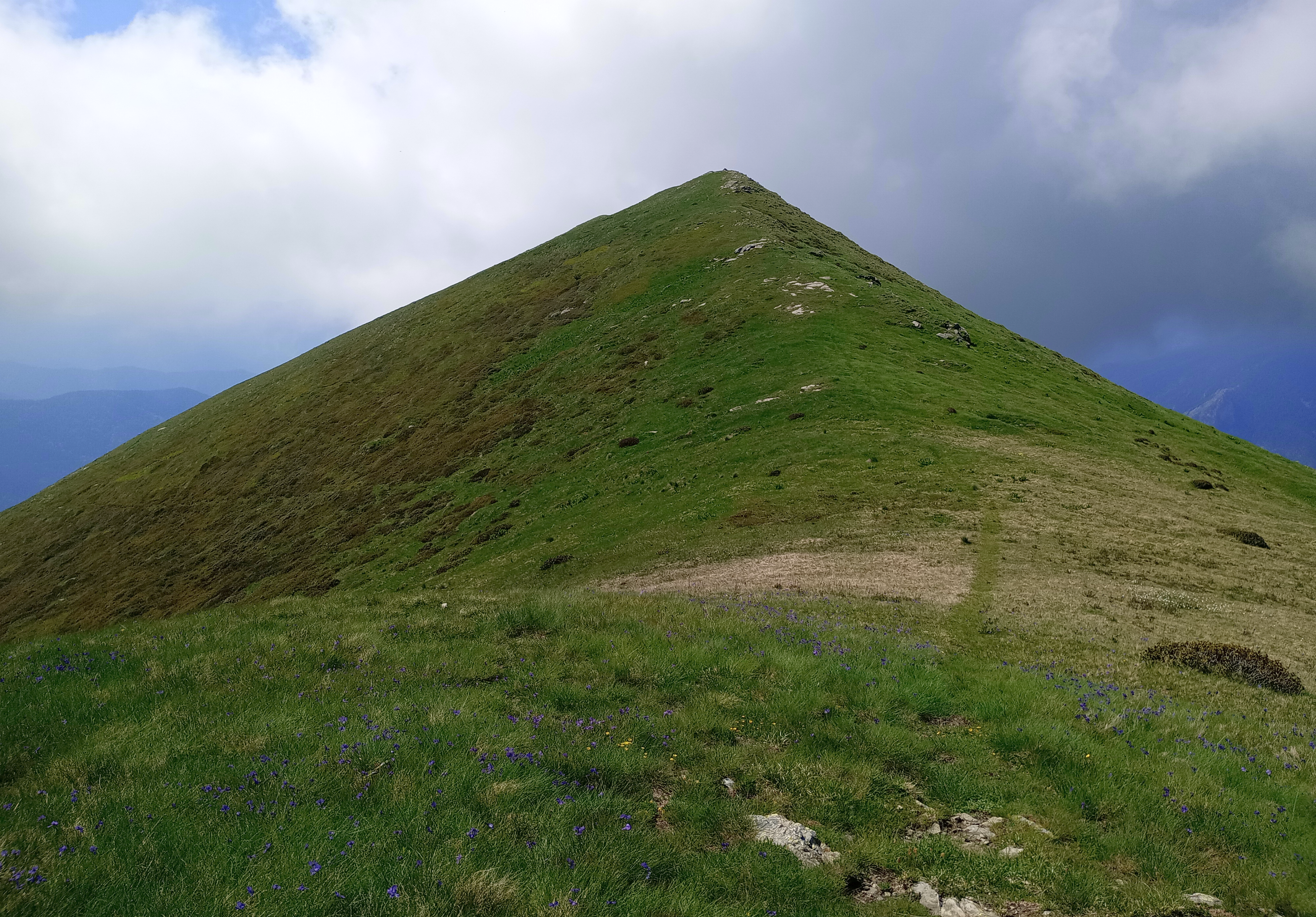
- top of the Cime de Pépin summit

Highest point
- Elevation: 2,344 meters (7,690 feet)
- Prominence: 258 meters (846 feet)
- Coordinates: 44°8′46″N 7°36′4″E

Geography
- Location within Alps Location within France
- Location: Provence-Alpes-Côte d'Azur, France
- Parent range: Ligurian Alps, Alps

The Cime de Pépin (also known as Mont Pepino) is a mountain whose peak is 2,344 meters (7,690 feet) above sea level. It is in the Mercantour National Park, close by the Col de Tende, in the Ligurian Alps, France. The mountain can be climbed via an easy hiking trail that starts from the Tenda Pass.
