= Cima di Serpentera Nord =

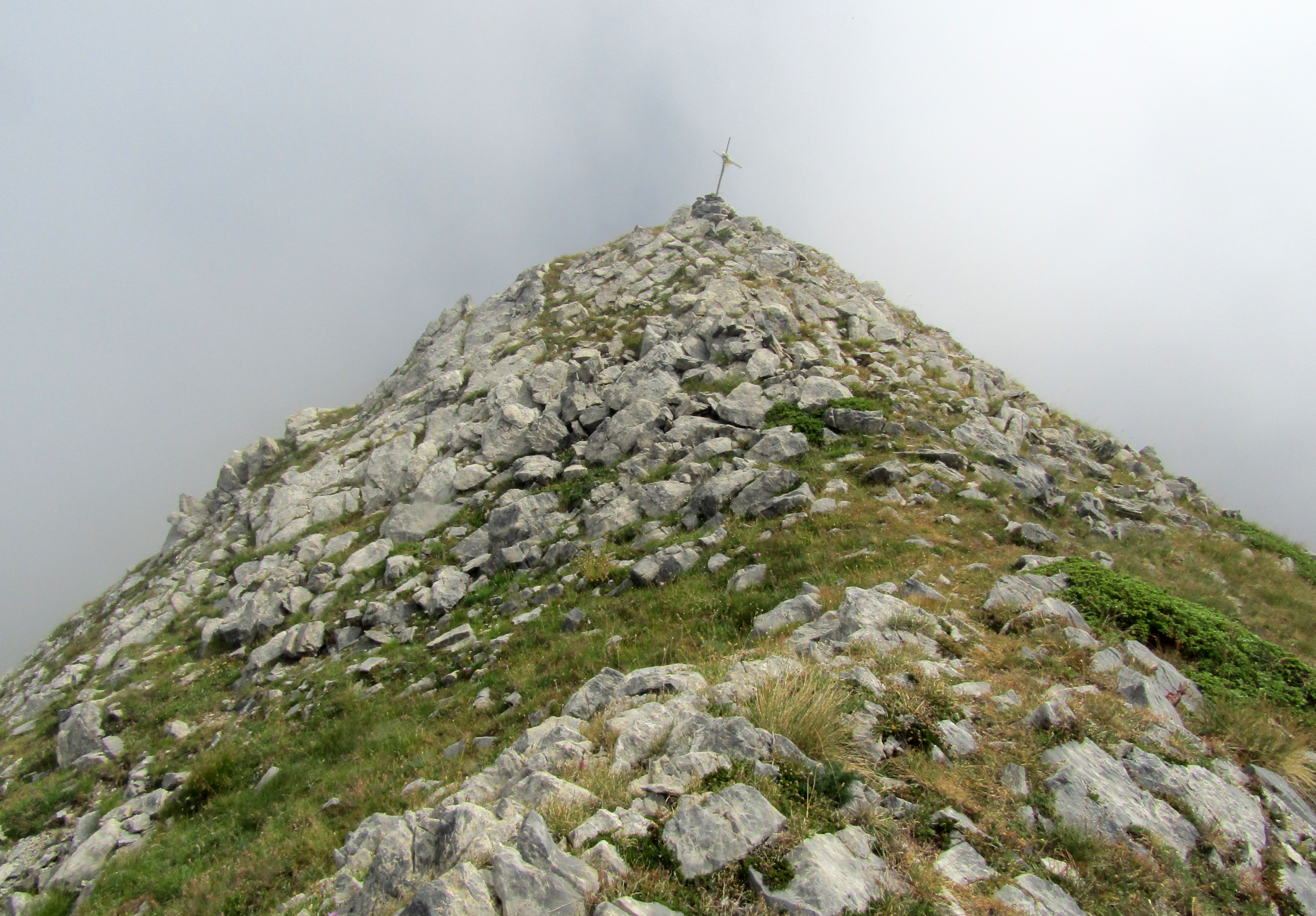
- The highest point

Highest point
- Elevation: 2,358 m (7,736 ft)
- Prominence: 130 m (430 ft)
- Coordinates: 44°11′50″N 7°42′01″E

Geography
- Country: Italy
- Region: Piedmont
- Parent range: Ligurian Alps

The Cima di Serpentera Nord (2,358 m (7,736 ft).) is the highest of the three mountains known as the Cime di Serpentera; it is located in the Ligurian Alps.

== History ==
In some ancient documents of the Certosa di Pesio, the area of the Cime di Serpentera is referred to by the toponym Zerpenteria.

== Geography ==
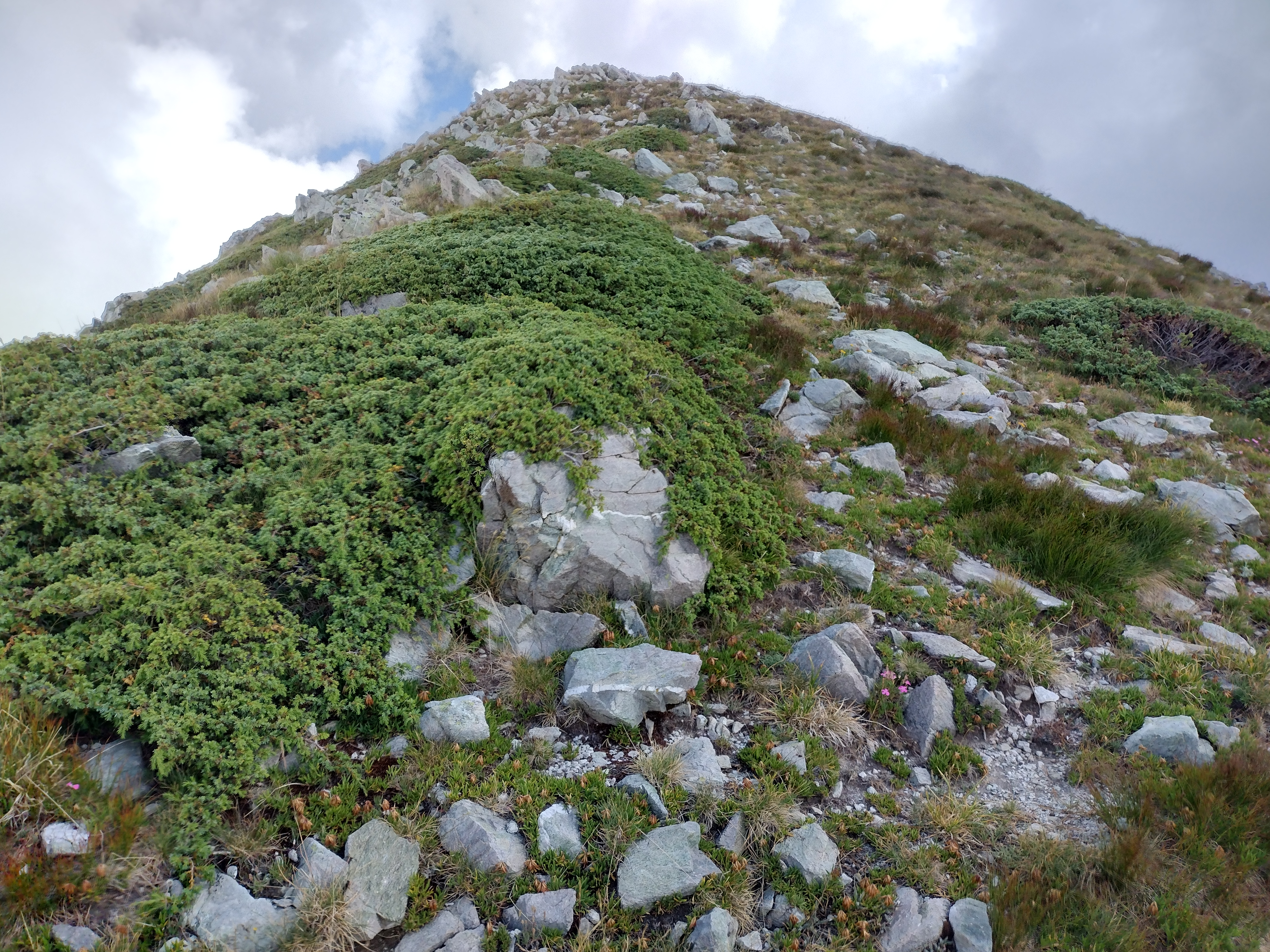
Central peak or Rocche Gaudioline

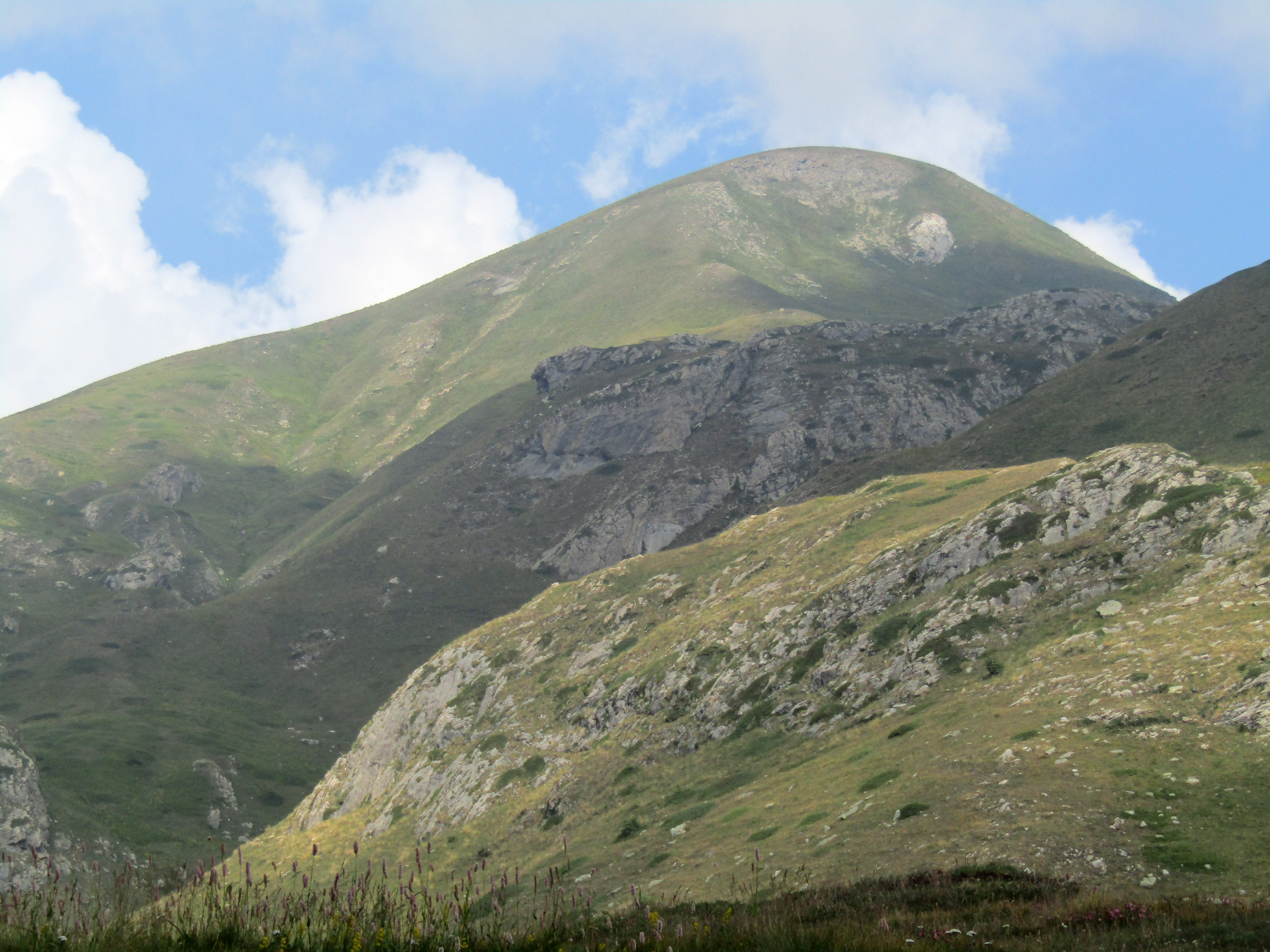
South peak

The Cime di Serpentera are located on the ridge that separates the Valle Ellero (to the east) from the Valle Pesio. They are situated north of the Porta Sestrera, starting from which one first encounters the rounded and grassy South Peak (2,344 m (7,690 ft)), then the Central Peak (also called Rocche Gaudioline, 2,356 m (7,730 ft)), and finally the North Peak. To the north of the latter, the ridge bifurcates: the main branch continues north towards the Cima Cars, while a secondary branch heads northeast, separating two tributary valleys of the Ellero, leading to the Rocche di Serpentera or Rocche Pical (2,239 m (7,346 ft)) and then petering out towards Pian Marchisio. The topographic prominence of the North Peak is 130 meters. The three peaks dominate the Lago delle Moie from the west.

In the Unified International Orographic Subdivision of the Alpine System, the mountain gives its name to the Serpentera-Cars Ridge, an Alpine subgroup.

== Geology ==
The area where the mountain is located is of a karst nature; referred to in speleological literature as the Area carsica Biecai – Serpentera, it is characterized by the presence of various natural cavities, including the "Abisso di Serpentera," located towards the Rocche di Serpentera.

== Access to the summit ==
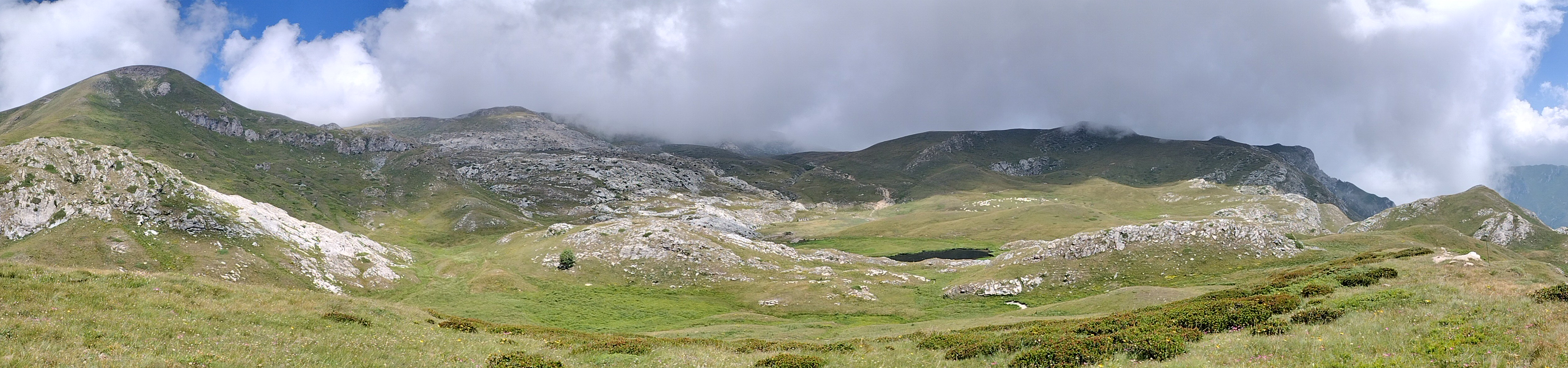
The Cime di Serpentera, partially in the clouds, seen from the east

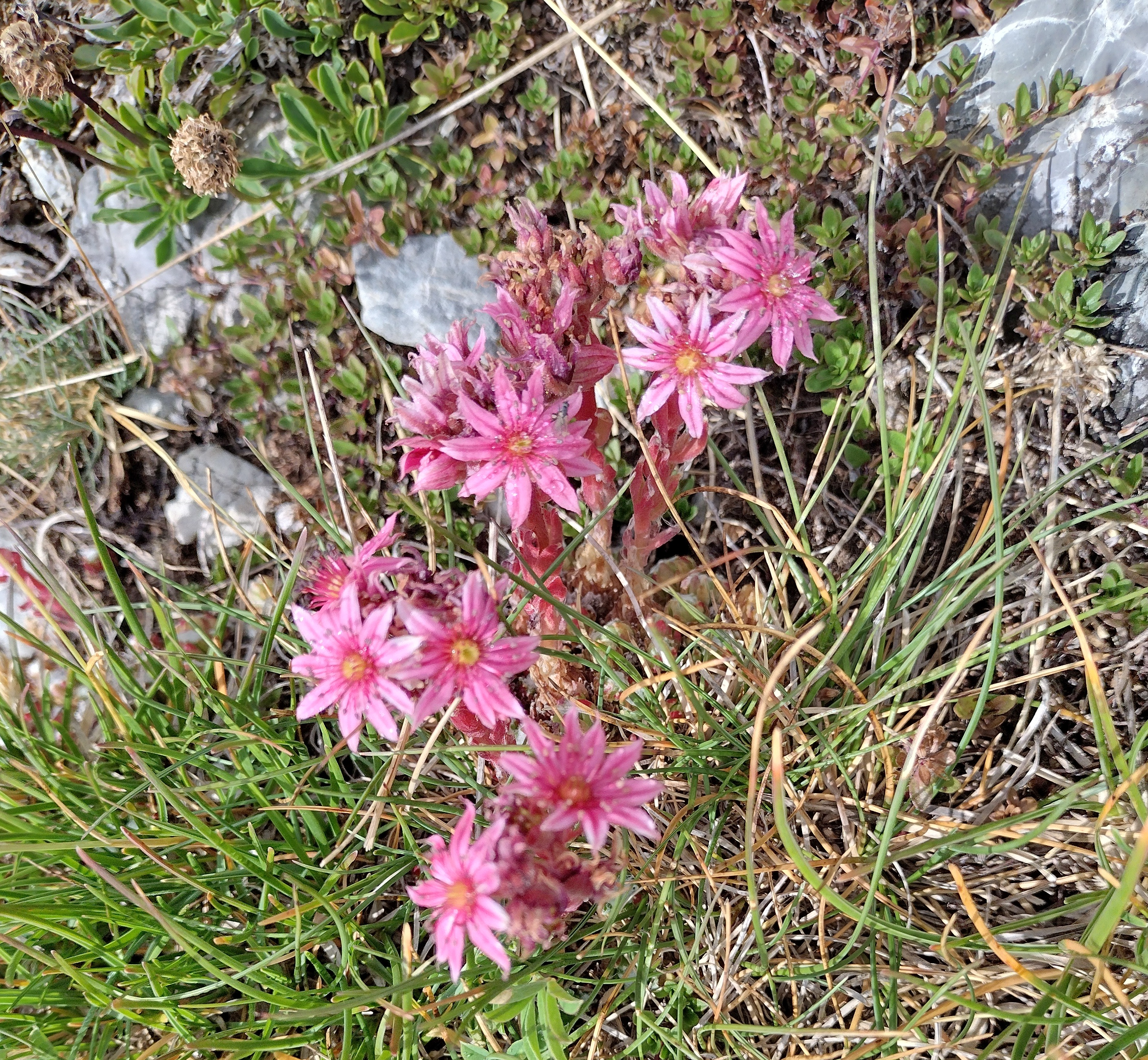
Sempervivum in bloom on Cima di Serpentera Nord

=== Summer access ===
The Cima di Serpentera can be reached from Porta Sestrera via an off-trail hiking route following the Ellero/Pesio ridge, also passing the other two peaks. In turn, Porta Sestrera is accessible via the Grande Traversata delle Alpi route in the section connecting the Rifugio Mondovì to Porta Sestrera.

The mountain is also a destination for cyclo-alpine mountain biking routes.

=== Winter access ===
The Cime di Serpentera are also a destination for winter and, preferably, spring ski mountaineering excursions, starting from Pian Marchisio (if the road is open) or Ponte Murato. The ascent is considered of difficulty MS (Medium Skiers).

== Nature conservation ==
The slopes of the mountain facing the Valle Pesio are part of the Parco naturale del Marguareis.

== Bibliography ==
- Marazzi, Sergio (2005). Atlante Orografico delle Alpi. SOIUSA [Orographic Atlas of the Alps. SOIUSA] (in Italian). Pavone Canavese: Priuli & Verlucca. ISBN 9788880682738. mara.
- Montagna, Euro; Montaldo, Lorenzo (1981). Alpi Liguri [Ligurian Alps]. Guida dei Monti d'Italia (in Italian). CAI-TCI. CAI-TCI.

Maps

- Cartografia ufficiale italiana in scala 1:25.000 e 1:100.000 [Official Italian Cartography at Scales 1:25,000 and 1:100,000] (in Italian). Istituto Geografico Militare.
- Carta dei sentieri e stradale scala 1:25.000 n. 22 Mondovì Val Ellero Val Maudagna Val Corsaglia Val Casotto [Trail and Road Map Scale 1:25,000 No. 22 Mondovì Val Ellero Val Maudagna Val Corsaglia Val Casotto] (in Italian). Ciriè: Fraternali editore. frat.
- Carta in scala 1:50.000 n. 8 Alpi Marittime e Liguri [Map Scale 1:50,000 No. 8 Maritime and Ligurian Alps] (in Italian). Turin: Istituto Geografico Centrale. igc.
