= Cima Cars =

Mountain in Italy

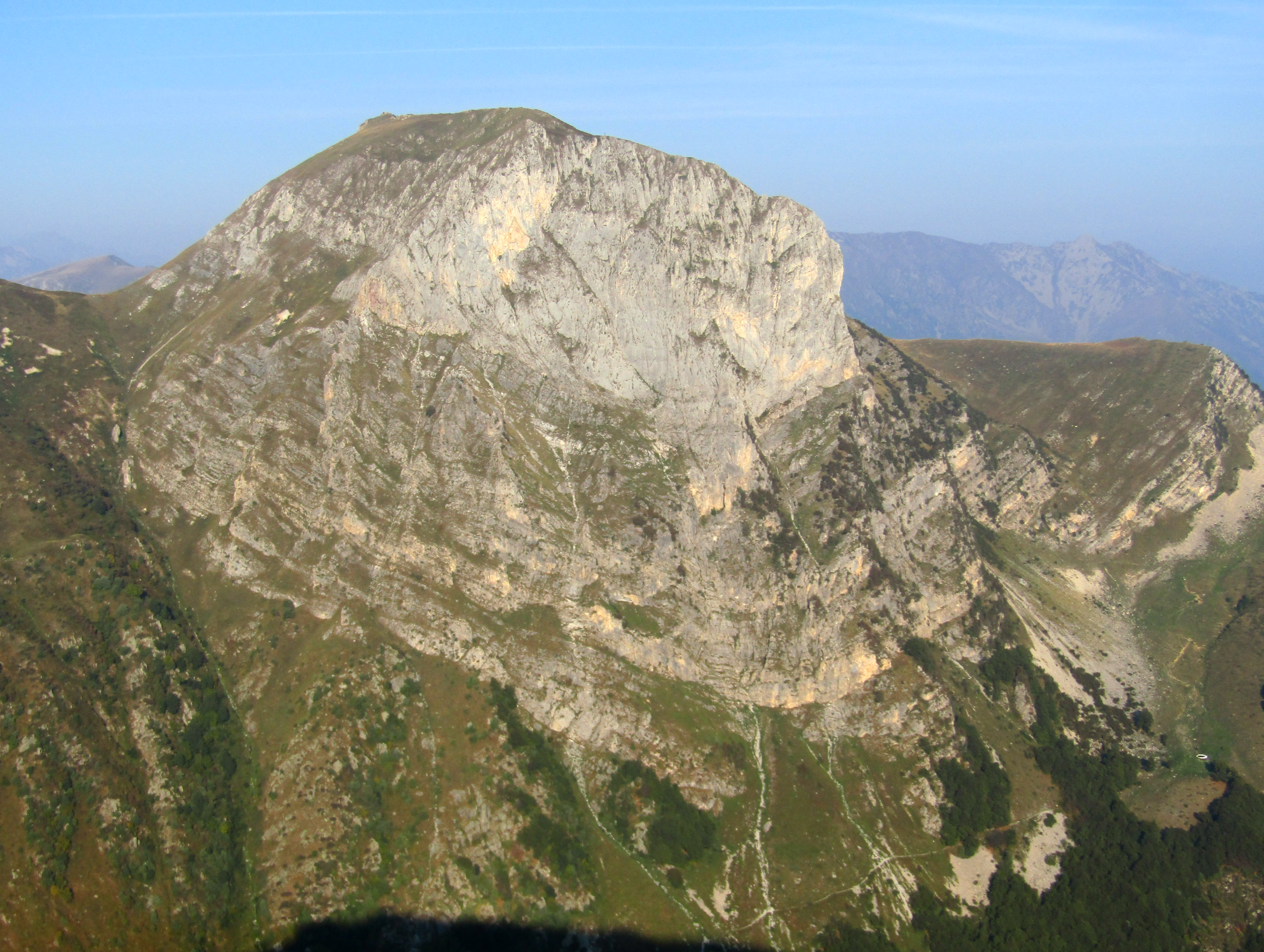
- The summit from Ellero Valley

Highest point
- Elevation: 2,218 m (7,277 ft)
- Prominence: 183 m (600 ft)
- Coordinates: 44°13′11″N 7°42′12″E

Geography
- Location within Alps
- Location: Piemonte, Italy
- Parent range: Ligurian Alps

Climbing
- First ascent: ancestral
- Easiest route: hiking

The Cima Cars is a mountain of the Ligurian Alps located in Piedmont (NW Italy).

== Geography ==
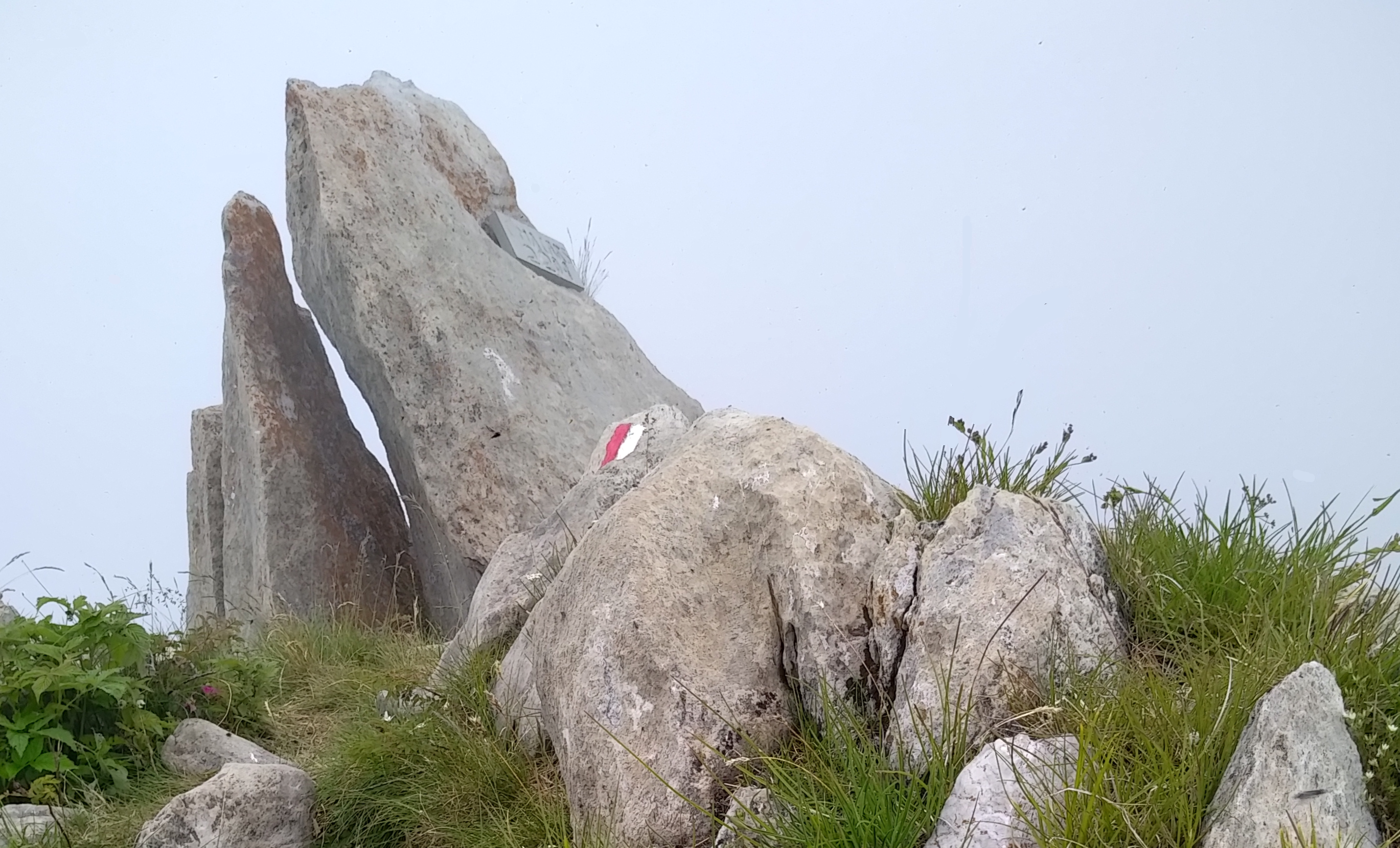
Summit of Cima Cars

The mountain stands on the ridge dividing the valleys of Ellero and Pesio. Is located between Colletto Pellerina (2.017 m, North) and Colle di Serpentera (2.035 m, South). Westwards from its summit starts a third ridge which divides two tributary valleys of the Pesio, vallone Serpentera (S) and vallone del Funtanin; on this ridge, close to a saddle at 1.985 m and a summit of 2.030 m, stands the Punta Bartivolera (1.957 m). The topographic prominence of Cima Cars is of 183 m, as results from the drop in height between the summit (2.218 m) and Colle di Serpentera (2.035 m), its key col. Some summit crosses stand on subsummits of Cima Cars located on its Ellero valley side.

=== SOIUSA classification ===
According to the SOIUSA (International Standardized Mountain Subdivision of the Alps) the mountain can be classified in the following way:

- main part = Western Alps
- major sector = South Western Alps
- section = Ligurian Alps
- subsection = It:Alpi del Marguareis/Fr:Alpes Liguriennes Occidentales
- supergroup = It:Catena Marguareis-Mongioie/Fr:Chaîne Marguareis-Mongioie
- group = It:Gruppo del Marguareis
- subgroup = It:Dorsale Serpentera-Cars
- code = I/A-1.II-B.2.b

== Geology ==
The area where the mountain stands is of karstic nature. The name Cars itself is linked to this geological feature, as other toponyms of the Ligurian Alps like as Le Carsene, Sella del Cars, Monte Carsino etc.

== Access to the summit ==
Cima Cars con be reached by a waymarked footpath starting from Pian delle Gorre (Pesio valley), or from the Ellero valley, in this case starting from Ponte Murato (Pian Marchisio).

The mountain is also a classical destination for Ski mountaineering, considered quite engaging (BS - good skiers - difficulty).

== Mountain huts ==
- Rifugio Pian delle Gorre (1.023 m).

== Conservation ==
The western slopes of the mountain, facing the Pesio Valley, are part of the Natural Park of Marguareis, a nature reserve established by Regione Piemonte.

== Bibliography ==
- Sergio Marazzi, Atlante Orografico delle Alpi. SOIUSA. Pavone Canavese (TO), Priuli & Verlucca editori, 2005.
- Montagna, Euro; Montaldo, Lorenzo (1981). "Alpi Liguri". Guida dei Monti d'Italia (in Italian). CAI-TCI.

== Maps ==
- Cartografia ufficiale italiana in scala 1:25.000 e 1:100.000 (Map). Istituto Geografico Militare.
- Carta in scala 1:50.000 n. 8 Alpi Marittime e Liguri (Map). Torino: Istituto Geografico Centrale.
- 1:25.000 map nr.16 "Val Vermenagna Valle Pesio Alta val Ellero Parco naturale del Marguareis" (Map). Ciriè: Fraternali.

Media related to Cima Cars at Wikimedia Commons
