= Col de Tende =

High mountain pass in the Alps

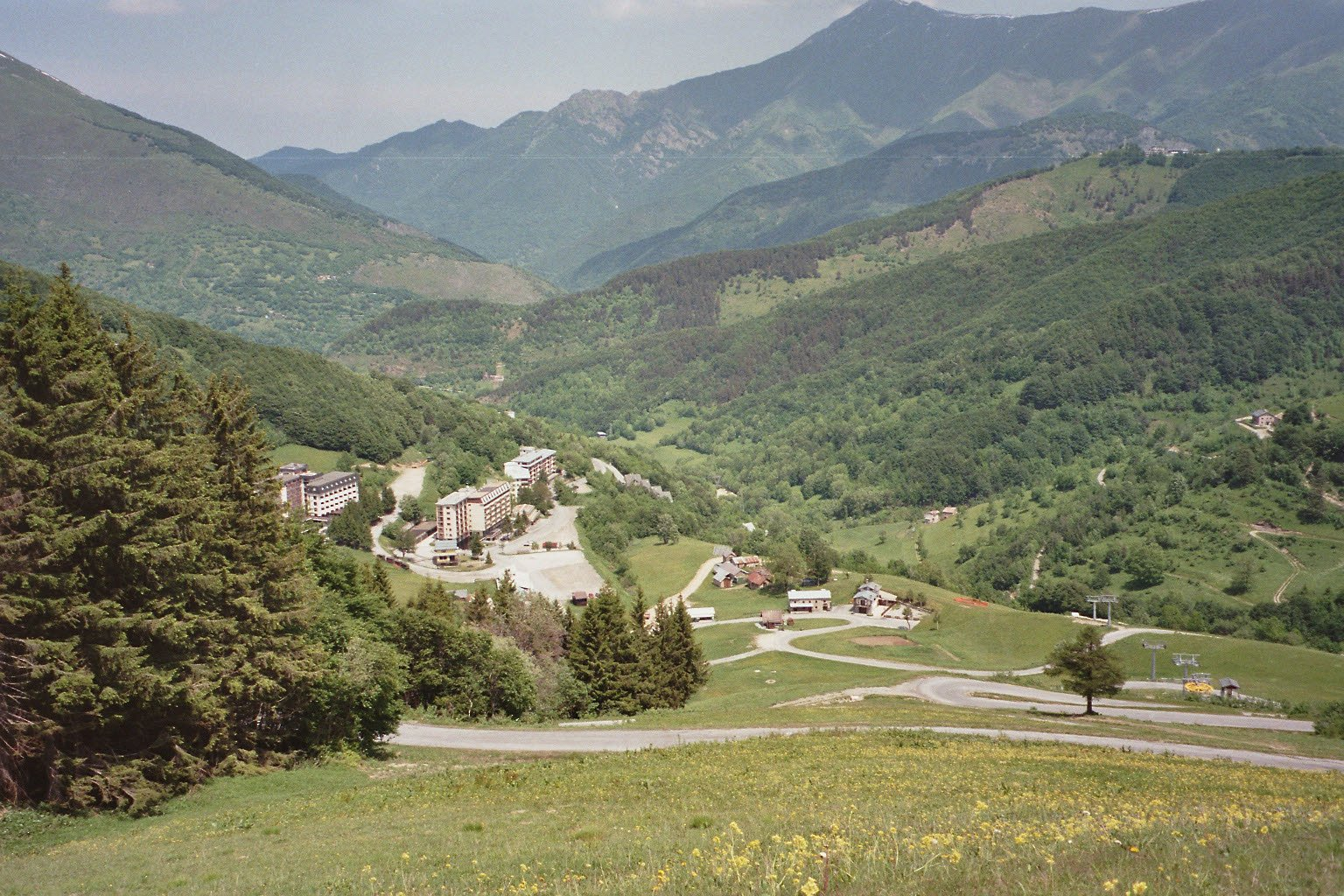
- Switchbacks on the pass road

- Location within Alps
- Elevation: 1,870 m (6,140 ft)
- Traversed by: road

Third Approach
- Location: Alpes-Maritimes / Province of Cuneo
- Range: Maritime Alps, Ligurian Alps
- Coordinates: 44°8′57″N 7°33′43″E

Col de Tende (Italian: Colle di Tenda; elevation 1870 m) is a high mountain pass in the Alps, close to the border between France and Italy, although the highest section of the pass is wholly within France.

== Pass ==
It separates the Maritime Alps from the Ligurian Alps. It connects Nice and Tende in Alpes-Maritimes with Cuneo in Piedmont. The pass is located between the Rocca dell'Abisso in the east and the Cime de Pépin in the west.

A railway tunnel inaugurated in 1898 and the Col de Tende Road Tunnel inaugurated in 1882 run under the pass. The latter tunnel is 3.2 kilometres long and is among the oldest long road tunnels.

French historian François Guizot states that the road was first developed by Phoenicians and later maintained by Greeks and Romans.

But, at the end of three or four centuries, these colonies fell into decay; the trade of the Phoenicians was withdrawn from Gaul, and the only important sign it preserved of their residence was a road which, starting from the eastern Pyrenees, skirted the Gallic portion of the Mediterranean, crossed the Alps by the pass of Tenda, and so united Spain, Gaul, and Italy. After the withdrawal of the Phoenicians this road was kept up and repaired, at first by the Greeks of Marseilles, and subsequently by the Romans.

== See also ==
- List of highest paved roads in Europe
- List of mountain passes
- France–Italy border
- Main chain of the Alps
