= Punta Marguareis =

Mountain in Italy

Punta Marguareis Pointe Marguareis
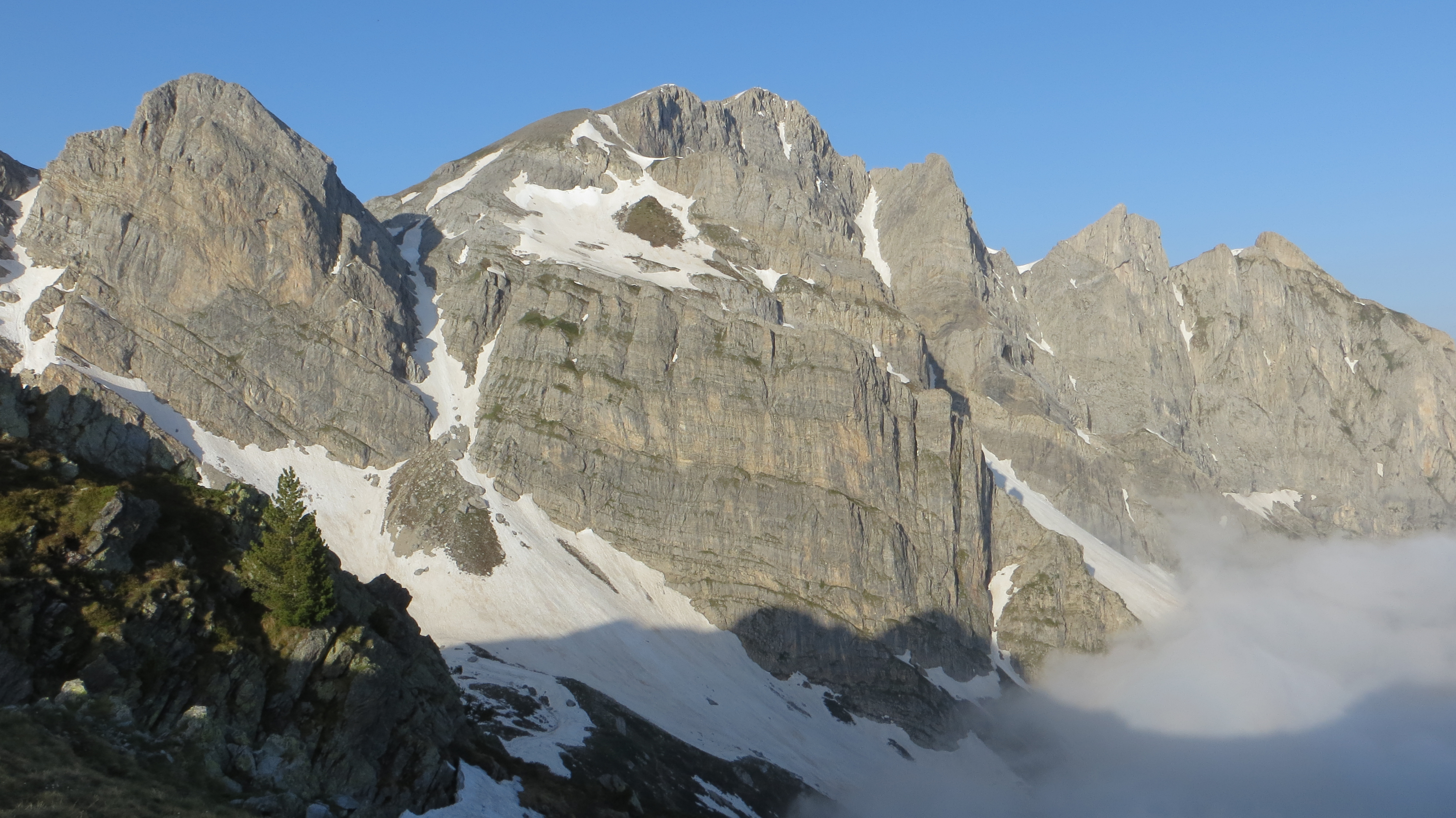
- North face

Highest point
- Elevation: 2,651 m (8,698 ft)
- Prominence: 780 m (2,560 ft)
- Isolation: 14.51 km (9.02 mi)
- Listing: Alpine mountains 2500-2999 m
- Coordinates: 44°09′58″N 7°40′58″E

Geography
- Location within Alps
- Location: Piedmont, Italy; Provence-Alpes-Côte d'Azur, France
- Parent range: Ligurian Alps

Climbing
- First ascent: documented: Lorenzo Pareto, 1903

The Punta Marguareis (It) or Pointe Marguareis (Fr) is a mountain in the Ligurian Alps, on the boundary between Italy and France; It is the highest peak of the Ligurian Alps.

== Geography ==
Administratively the Marguareis is divided between the Italian region of Piemonte (province: Cuneo) and the French region of Provence-Alpes-Côte d'Azur (department: Alpes-Maritimes).

=== SOIUSA classification ===
According to the SOIUSA (International Standardized Mountain Subdivision of the Alps) the mountain can be classified in the following way:

- main part = Western Alps
- major sector = South Western Alps
- section = Ligurian Alps
- subsection = (It:Alpi del Marguareis/Fr:Alpes Liguriennes Occidentales)
- supergroup = (It:Catena Marguareis-Mongioie/Fr:Chaîne Marguareis-Mongioie)
- group = (It:Gruppo del Marguareis/Fr:Groupe du Marguareis)
- subgroup = (It:Nodo del Marguareis/Fr:Nœud du Marguareis)
- code = I/A-1.II-B.2.a

== Geology ==
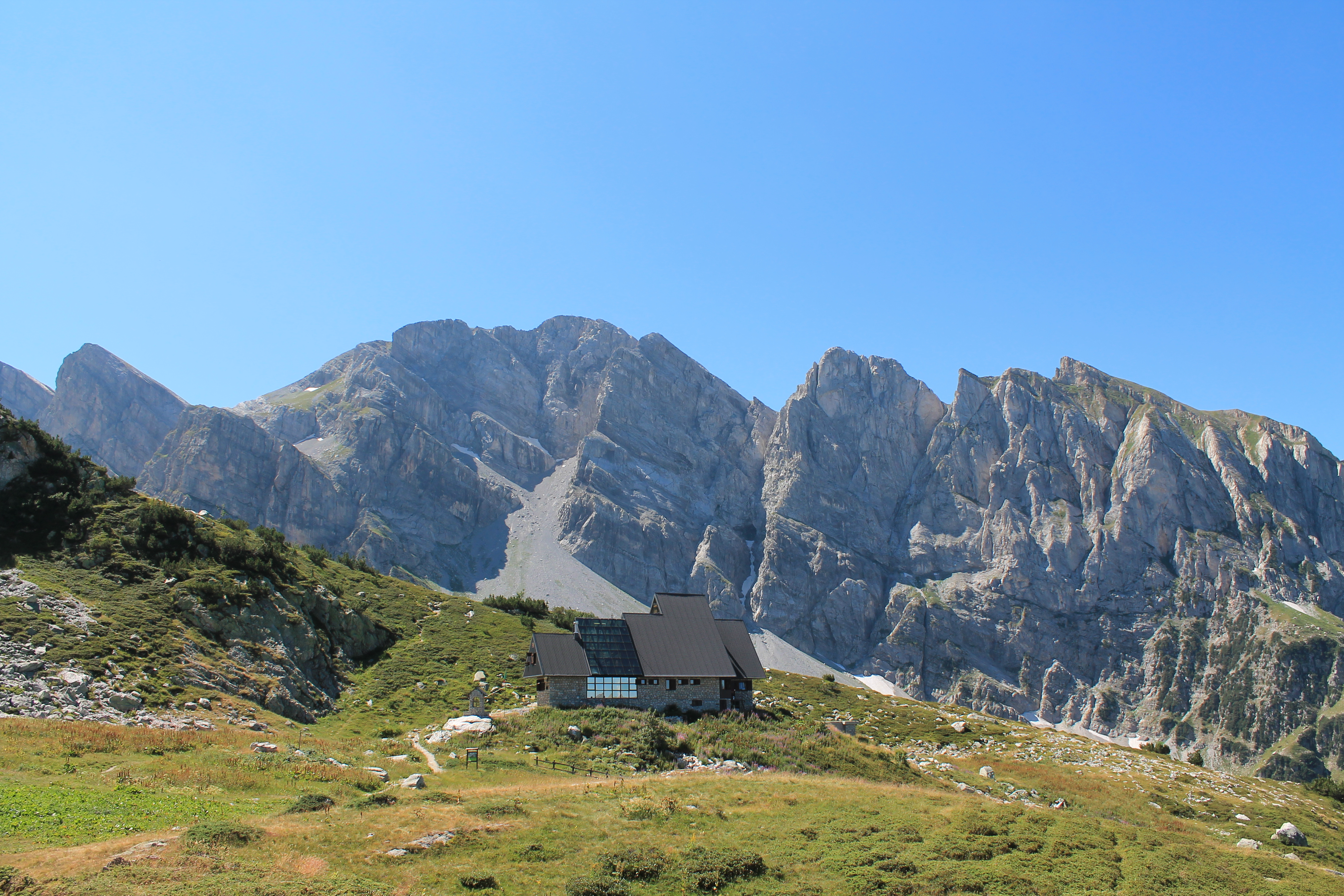
Rifugio Garelli and punta Marguareis

The Marguareis is part of a karst area where there are many caves that are very popular among speleologists.

== Maps ==
- Italian official cartography (Istituto Geografico Militare - IGM); on-line version: www.pcn.minambiente.it
- French official cartography (Institut Géographique National - IGN); on-line version: www.geoportail.fr

== Bibliography ==
- Parodi, Andrea (2003). Laghi, cascate e altre meraviglie. Andrea Parodi Editore.
