= Vermenagna =

Stream in Piedmont, Italy

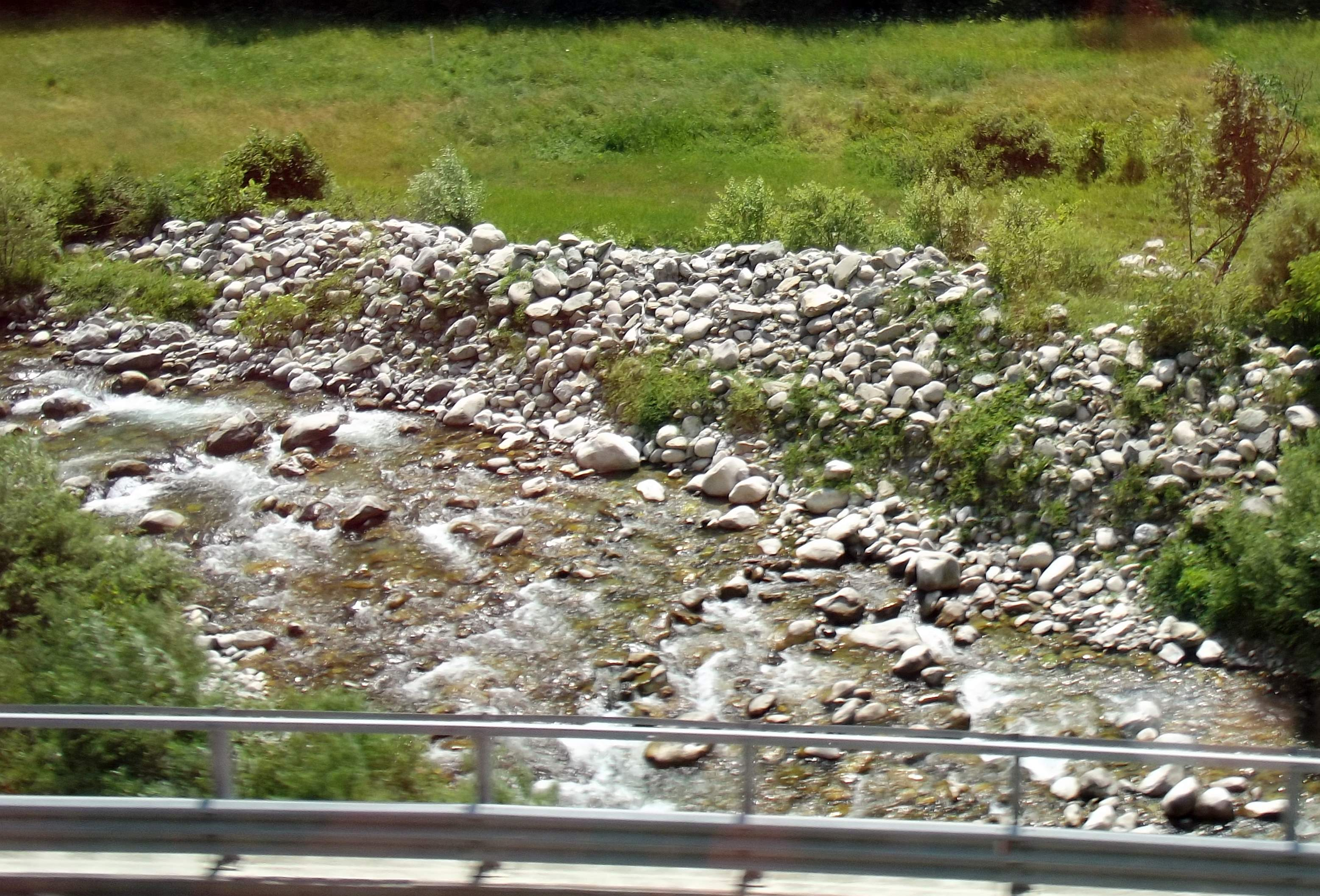
- The river as seen from the Cuneo-Limone-Ventimiglia railway

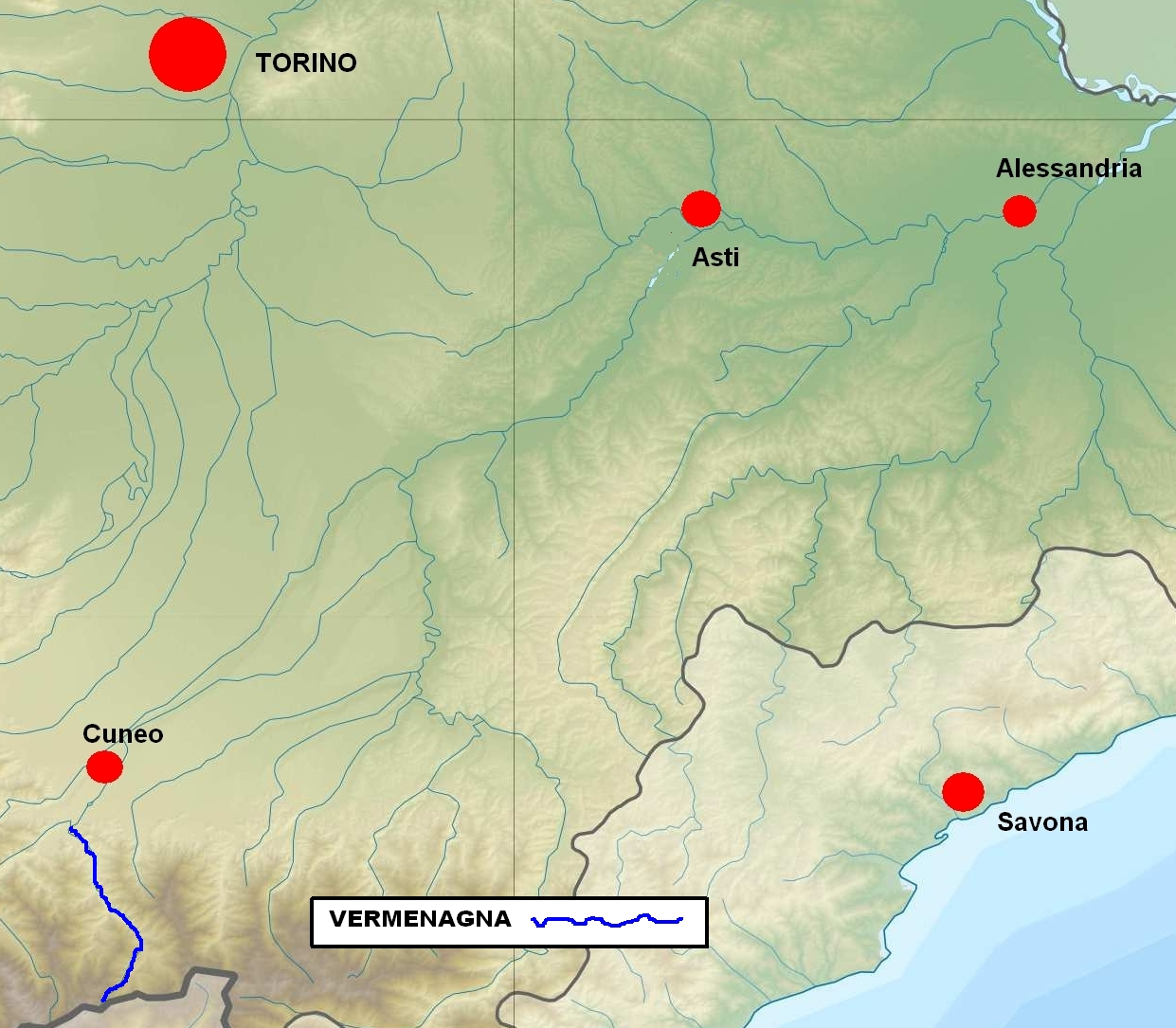
- Location within southern Piedmont

Location
- Country: Italy
- Region: Piedmont
- Province: Province of Cuneo

Physical characteristics
- Source
  - location: N side of the Colle di Tenda (Maritime Alps/Ligurian Alps)
- Mouth: Gesso
  - coordinates: 44.3254°N 7.5009°E
- Length: 27.1-kilometre (16.8 mi)
- Basin size: 166.17 km^{2} (64.16 mi^{2})
- Discharge
  - location: near Borgo San Dalmazzo
  - average: 4.5

Basin features
- Progression: Gesso-->Stura di Demonte-->Tanaro→ Po→ Adriatic Sea

The Vermenagna is a 27.1-kilometre (16.8 mi) long river in northwestern Italy (Piedmont).

== Geography ==
The Vermenagna is a tributary to the river Gesso, in the river Po basin. Its source is a small lake higher than 2000 m close to the Rocca dell'Abisso, not faraway from the Colle di Tenda; after Limonetto the flows crosses the comunes of Limone Piemonte and Vernante, where it gets from the left bank its main tributary, the rio di Valle Grande, which collects the waters of the valley of Palanfrè (or ‘’Val Grande’’). Its course continues reaching Robilante and Roccavione; on the border between the latter comune with Borgo San Dalmazzo the Vermenagna ends in the Gesso, at 610 of elevation. The course of the Vermenagna separates the Maritime Alps from the Ligurian Alps.

=== Main tributaries ===
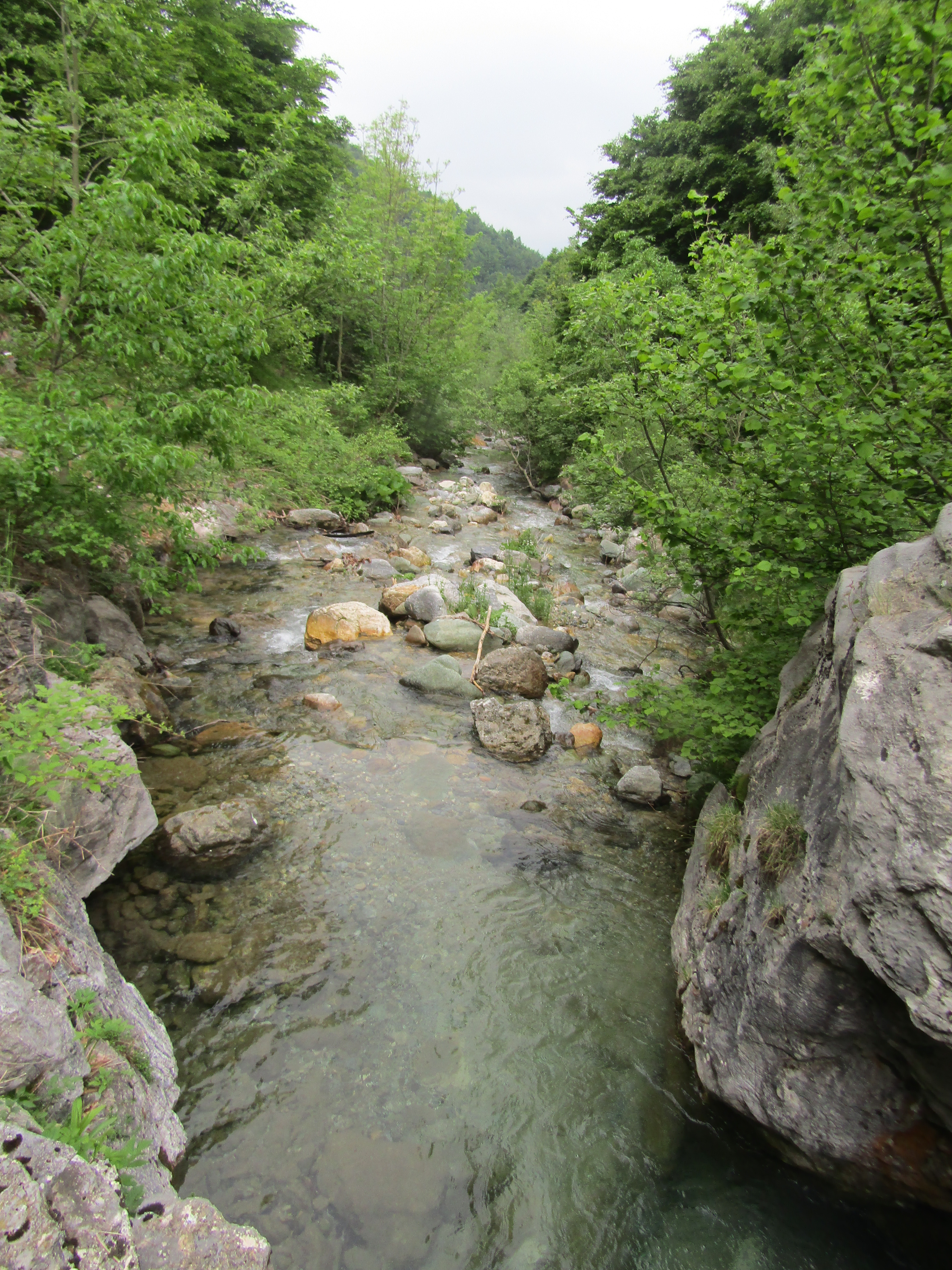
Torrente Valleggia

- Left side:
  - rio di Valle Grande.
- Right side:
  - torrente Valleggia;
  - rio Malandrè.

== See also ==
- Natural Park of Marguareis
- List of rivers of Italy
