= Pesio =

Italian river

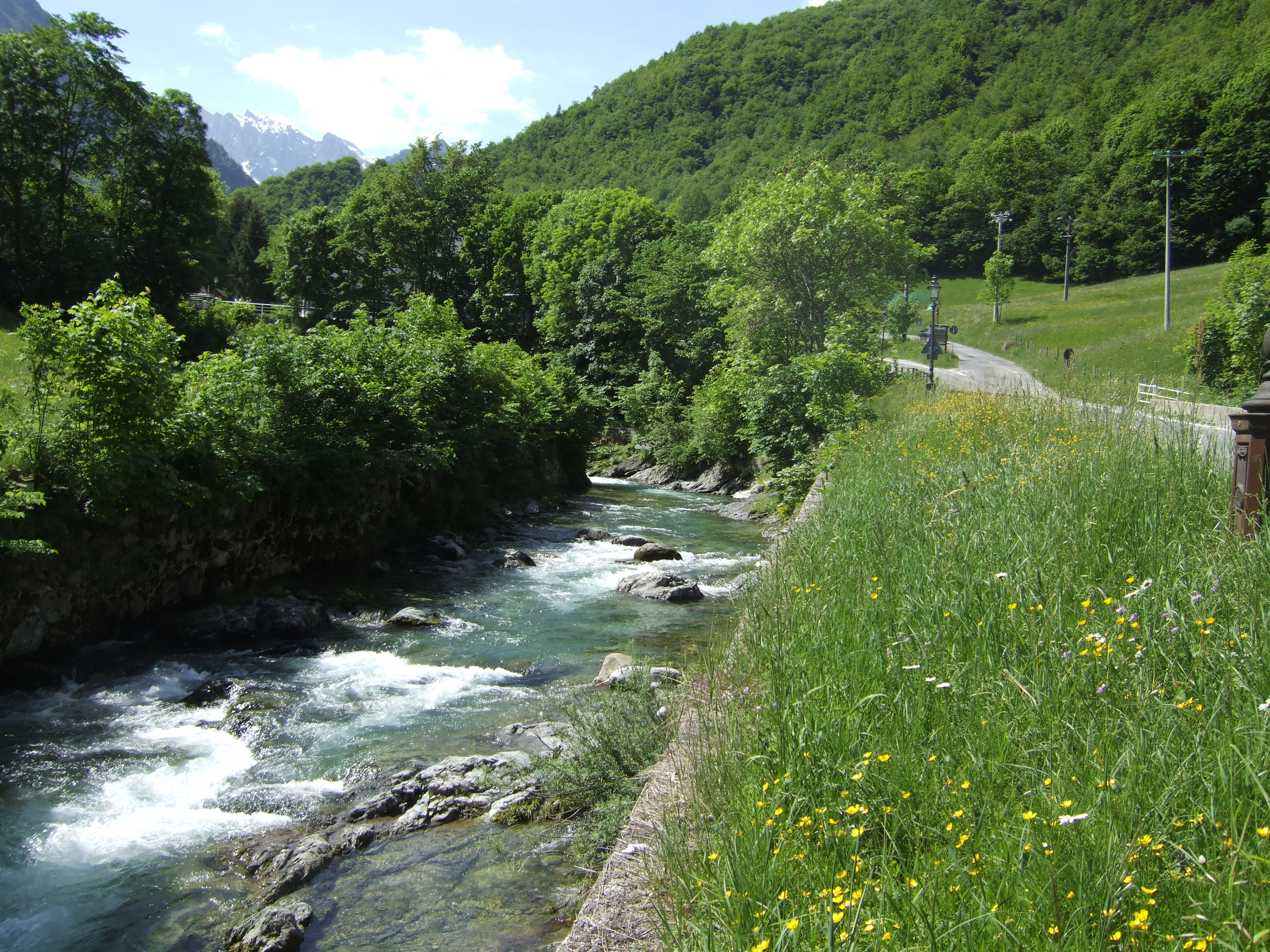
- The river near the Certosa di Pesio

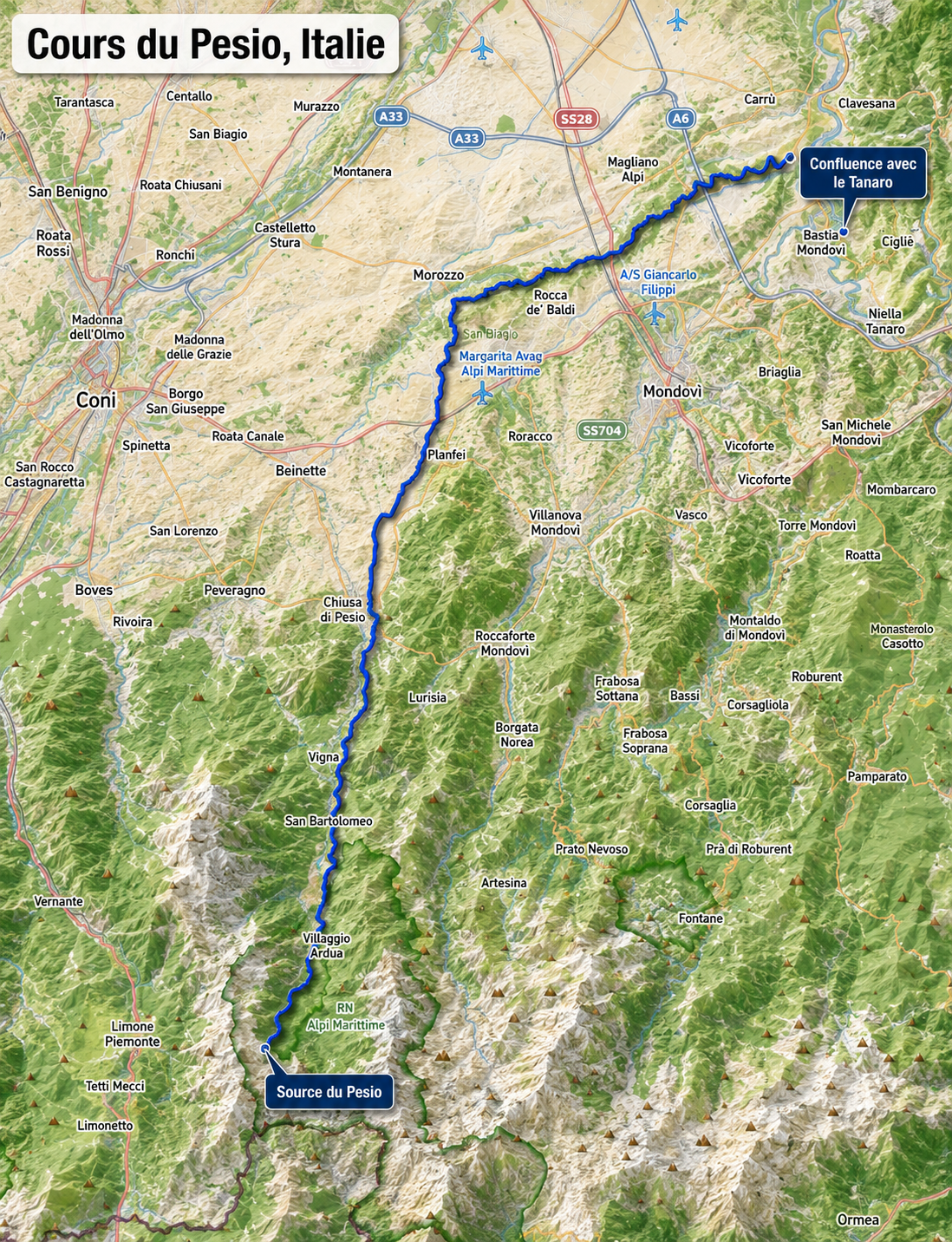
- Location within southern Piedmont

Location
- Country: Italy
- Region: Piedmont
- Province: Province of Cuneo

Physical characteristics
- Source
  - location: N side of the Marguareis (Ligurian Alps)
- Mouth: Tanaro
  - coordinates: 44.4701°N 7.8913°E
- Length: 48.8-kilometre (30.3 mi)
- Basin size: 401.9 km^{2} (155.2 mi^{2})
- Discharge
  - location: near Carrù
  - average: 7.83

Basin features
- Progression: Tanaro→ Po→ Adriatic Sea
- Tributaries
  - left: Brobbio
  - right: Pogliole, Branzola

The Pesio is a 48.8-kilometre (30.3 mi) long river in northwestern Italy (Piedmont).

== Geography ==
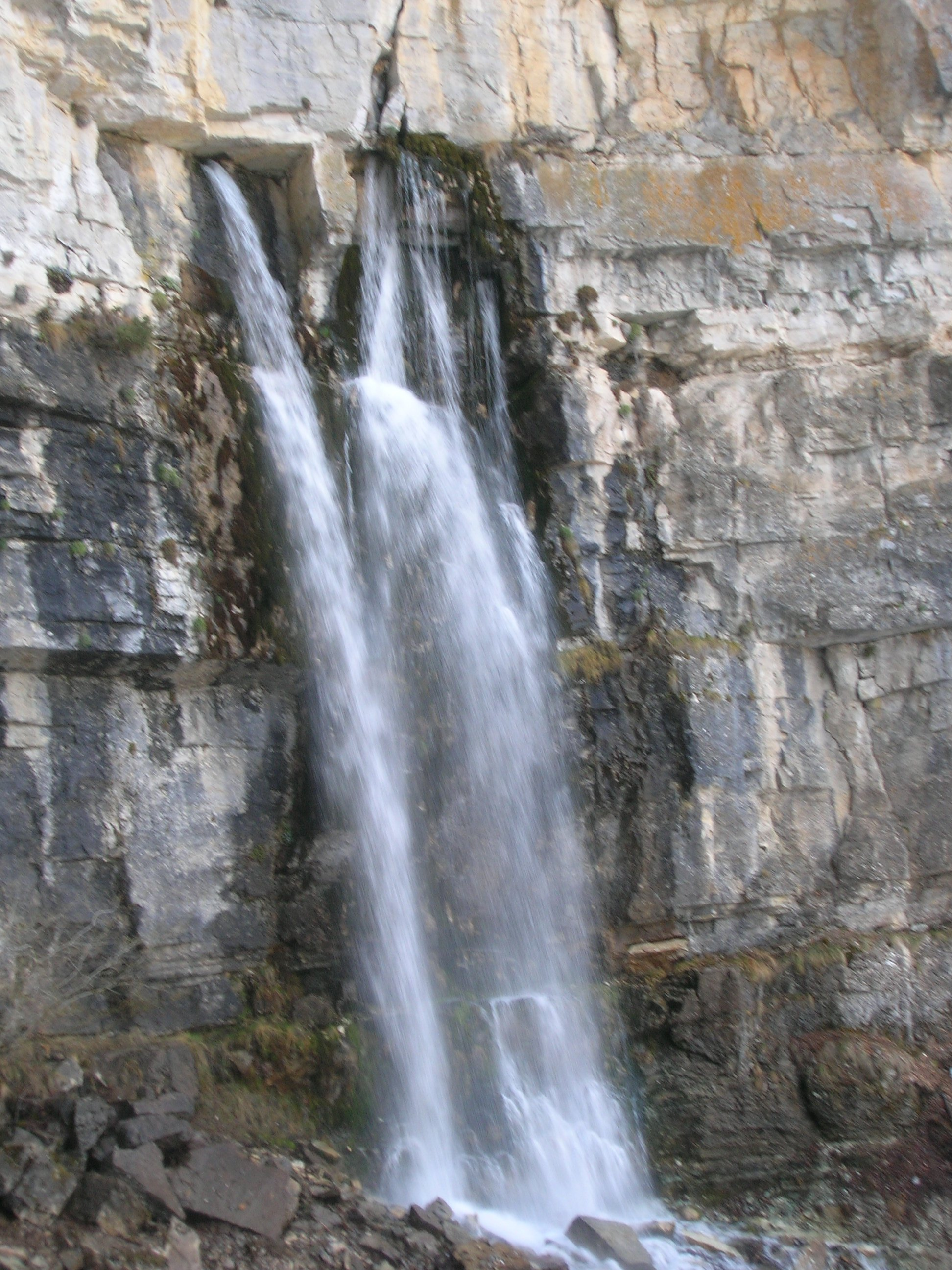
Pis del Pesio, a waterfall in the upper part of the Pesio watershed

The river is a tributary to the river Tanaro, which is a tributary of the river Po. Its source is on the northern slopes of the Marguareis, the highest summit of the Ligurian Alps. It flows northwards digging the Valle Pesio, which ends in the Po plain near Chiusa di Pesio. The Pesio then follows its course through the plain heading north up to Morozzo, where it gets from the left its main tributary, the Brobbio, and turns NE. Then, with some meander, it reaches the Tanaro a couple of km south of Carrù.

=== Main tributaries ===
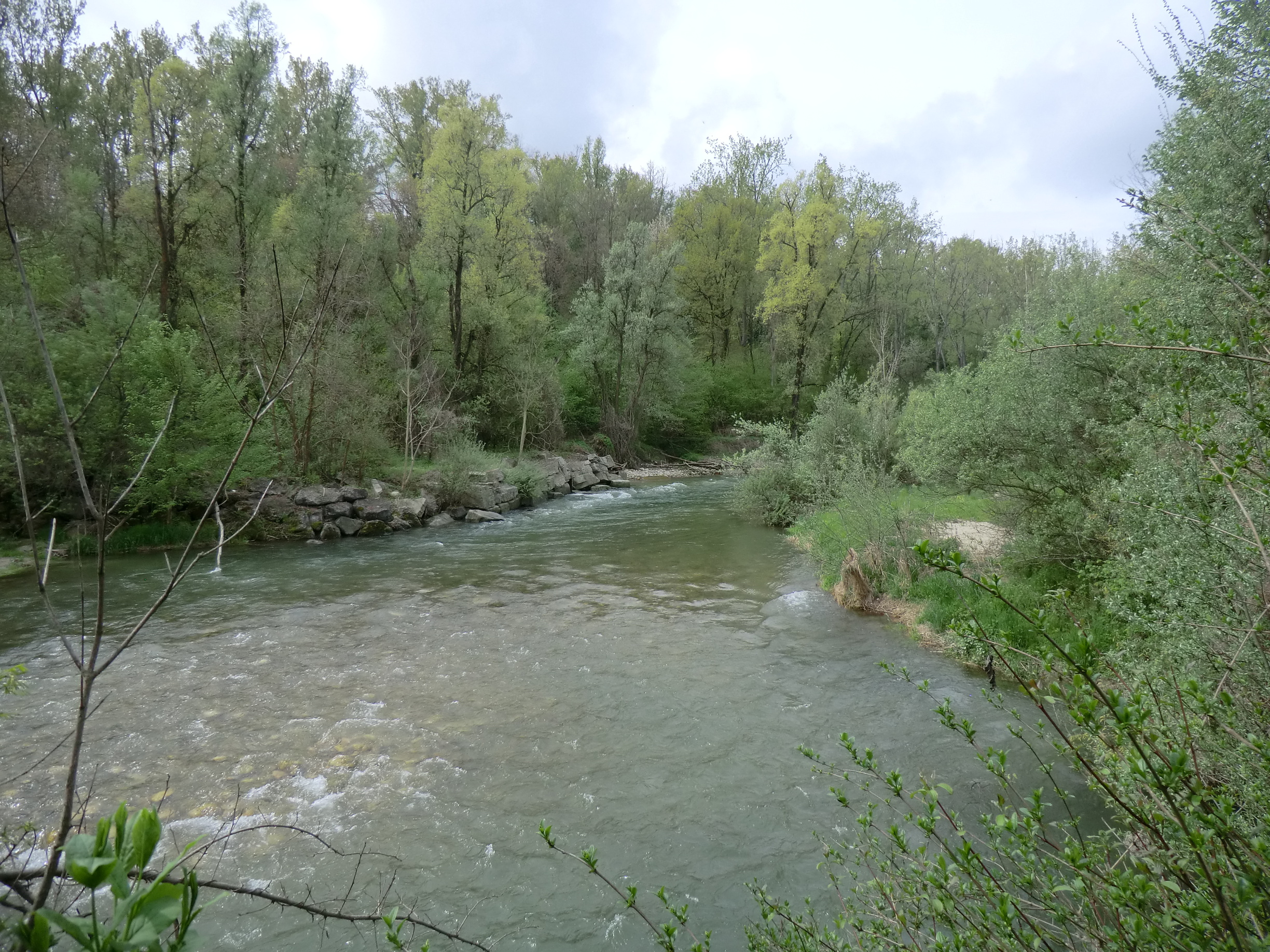
The Pesio in the plain (Morozzo)

- Left side:
  - torrente Brobbio, which also collects the waters of the Josina.
- Right side:
  - torrente Pogliole,
  - torrente Branzola.

== See also ==
Media related to Pesio at Wikimedia Commons

- Natural Park of Marguareis
- List of rivers of Italy
