= Ligurian Alps =

Mountain range in Italy and France

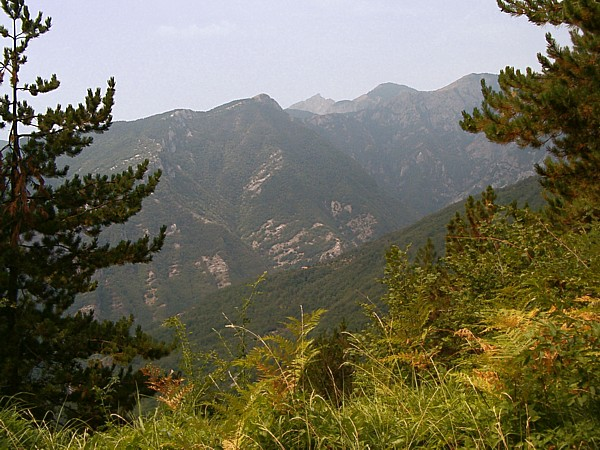

Highest point
- Peak: Punta Marguareis
- Elevation: 2,651 m (8,698 ft)
- Listing: Prominent mountains of the Alps

Naming
- Native name: Alpes Ligures (French); Alpi Liguri (Italian)

Geography
- Location within Italy Location within France
- Countries: Italy; France
- Region, Région: Piedmont; Liguria; Provence-Alpes-Côte d'Azur
- Range coordinates: 44°10′N 8°5′E
- Parent range: Alps
- Borders on: Apennines; Maritime Alps

Geology
- Orogeny: Alpine orogeny

The Ligurian Alps are a mountain range in northwestern Italy. A small part is located in France. They form the south-western extremity of the Alps, separated from the Apennines by the Colle di Cadibona. The Col de Tende and the Vermenagna valley separate them from the Maritime Alps. They form the border between Piedmont in the north and Liguria in the south.

== Geography ==
Administratively the range is divided between the Italian provinces of Cuneo, Imperia and Savona and the French department of Alpes-Maritimes (south-western slopes).

The Ligurian Alps are drained by the Tanaro River, along with other tributaries of the Po River, on the Piedmontese side, and by several smaller rivers that flow directly to the Mediterranean Sea on the Ligurian and French side.

== Chief peaks and passes ==
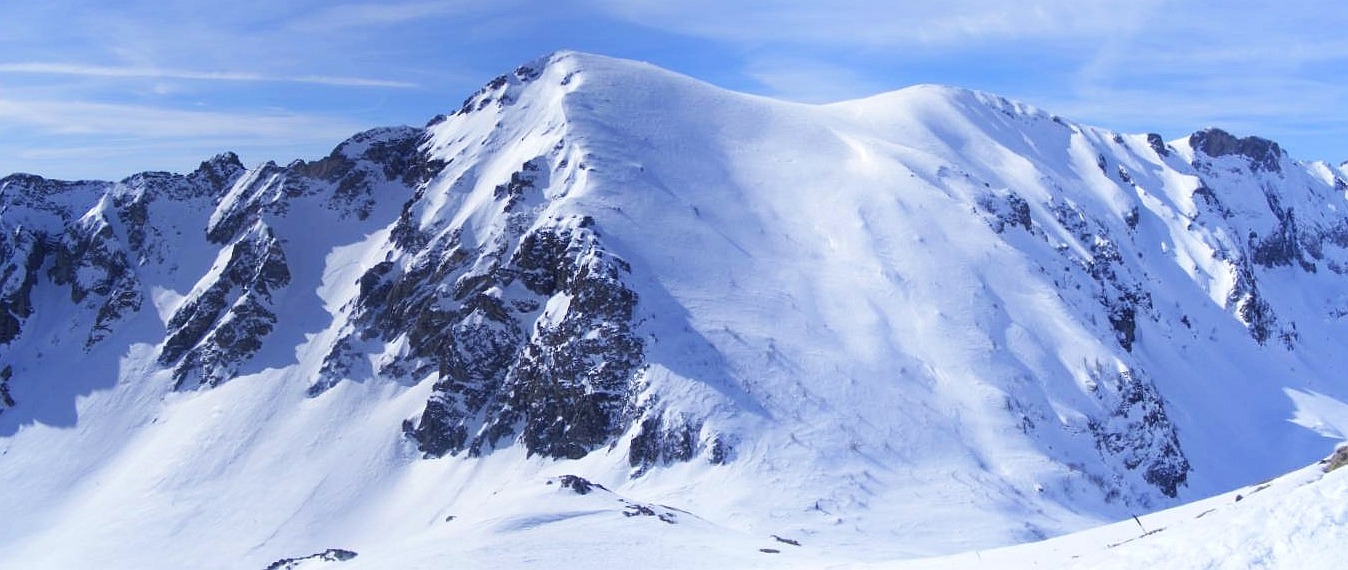
Monte Antoroto in winter from Monte Grosso

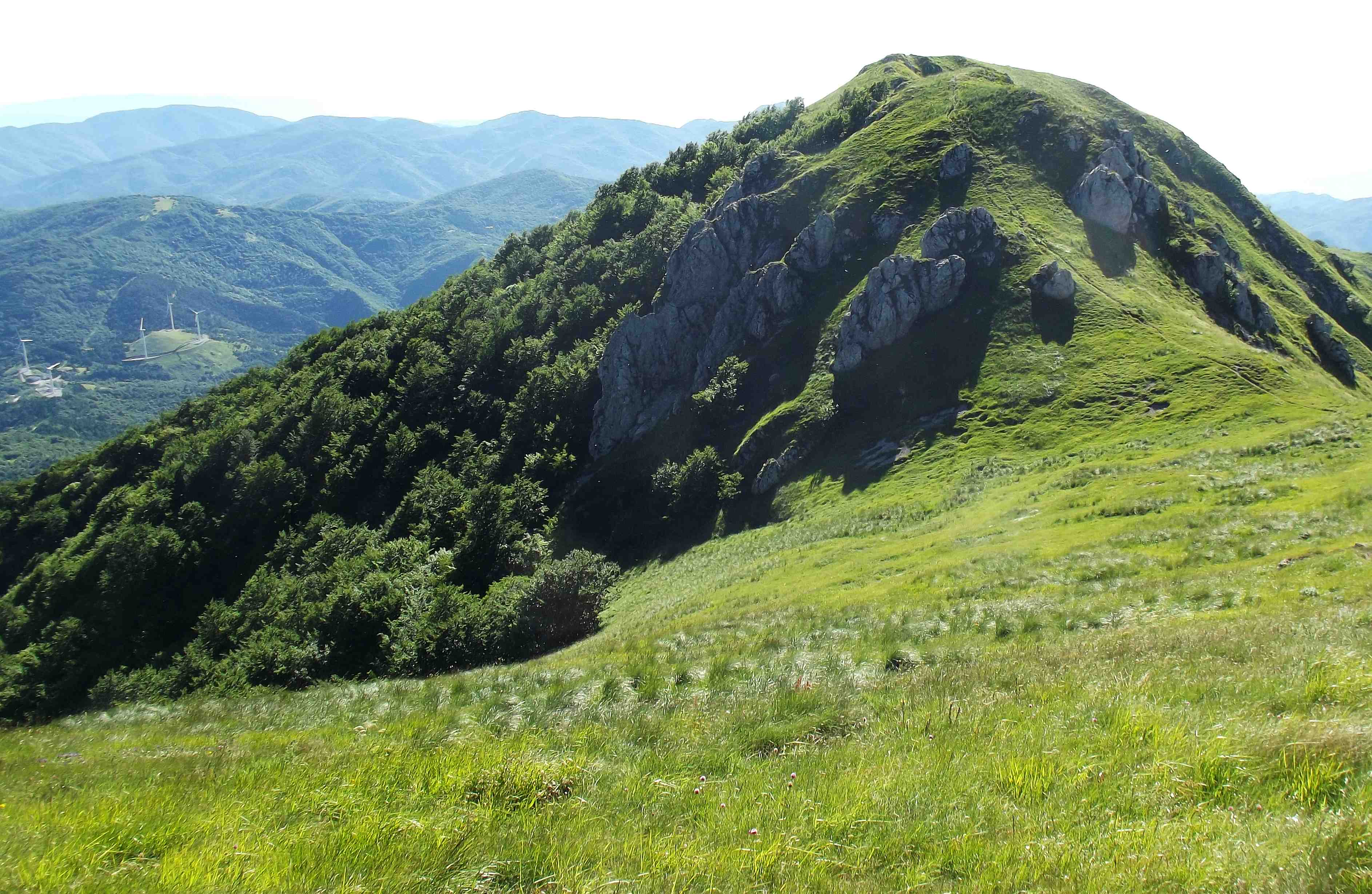
Summer on Monte Galero

The chief peak of the Western Ligurian Alps is Punta Marguareis (2,651 m), and there are several other summits over 2000 m, while in Eastern Ligurian Alps (also called Ligurian Prealps) the maximum elevation is 1739 m (Monte Armetta).

Name	metres	feet
Punta Marguareis	2,651	8,695
Monte Mongioie	2,631	8,632
Cima delle Saline	2,612	8,567
Bric di Conoia	2,521	8,271
Cima della Fascia	2,495	8186
Monte Bertrand	2,480	8136
Pizzo d'Ormea	2,476	8,121
Cima di Pertegà	2,404	7,887
Bric Costa Rossa	2,403	7,884
Cima di Serpentera Nord	2,358	7,736
Cime de Missun	2,255	7726
Monte Besimauda	2,231	7,317
Cima Cars	2,218	7,277
Monte Saccarello	2,201	7,219
Punta Mirauda	2,157	7077
Monte Frontè	2,152	7,058
Monte Antoroto	2,144	7,032
Monte Tanarello	2,096	6,877
Monte Fantino	2,094	6,870
Monte Monega	1,882	6,175
Bric Mindino	1,879	6,163
Monte Armetta	1,739	5,703
Monte Galero	1,708	5,602
Monte della Guardia	1,658	5,440
Rocca delle Penne	1,501	4,925
Monte Carmo di Loano	1,389	4,555
Monte Settepani	1,386	4,546
Monte Spinarda	1,357	4,453
Monte Cianea	1,226	4,022
Monte Camulera	1,224	4,016
Rocca Barbena	1,142	3,747
Monte Peso Grande	1,092	3,583
Monte Alpe	1,056	3,465

Some important passes in the Ligurian Alps are listed below.

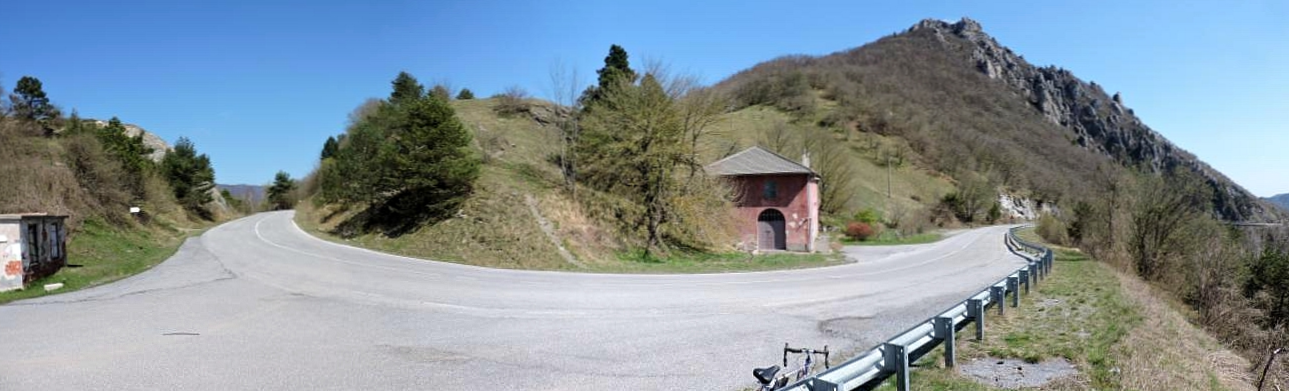
Colle Scravaion

Name	Location	Type	Elevation
Colle di Cadibona	Savona to Altare	highway	436 m (1,430 ft)
Colle di Melogno	Finale Ligure to Calizzano	road	1,028 m (3,373 ft)
Giogo di Toirano	Toirano to Bardineto	road	801 m (2,628 ft)
Colle Scravaion	Castelvecchio di Rocca Barbena to Bardineto	road	814 m (2,671 ft)
Colle San Bernardo	Albenga to Garessio	road	957 m (3,140 ft)
Colle di Nava	Imperia to Ormea	road	934 m (3,064 ft)
Colle del Quazzo	Calizzano to Garessio	road	1,090 m (3,580 ft)
Colle San Bernardo di Mendatica	Mendatica to Triora and Colle di Nava	road	1,262 m (4,140 ft)
Col de Tende/Colle di Tenda	Tende to Cuneo	road	1,870 m (6,140 ft)
Passo della Teglia	Molini di Triora to Rezzo	road	1,385 m (4,544 ft)

== Conservation ==
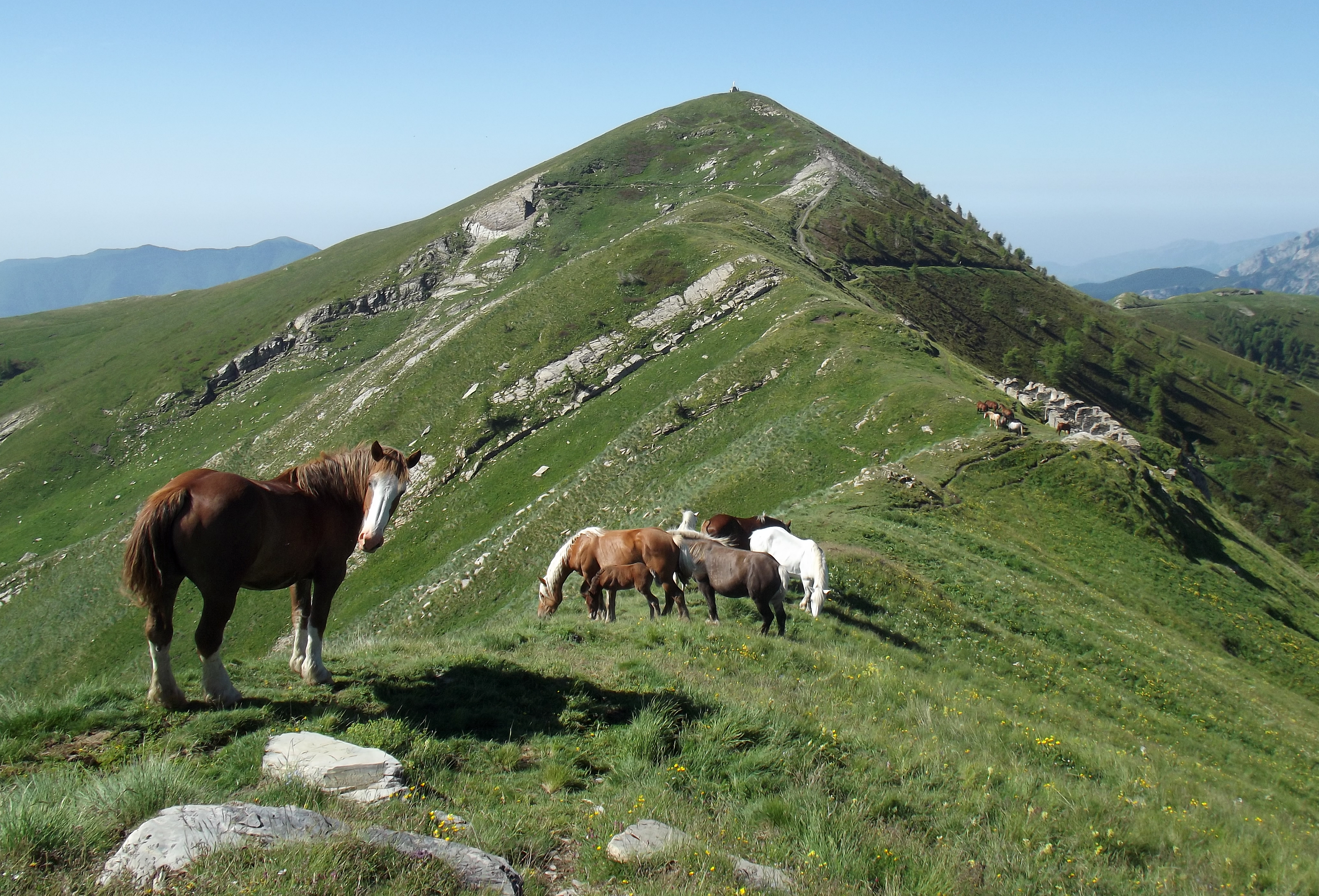
Parco naturale regionale delle Alpi Liguri: Monte Frontè and Cima Garlenda

Around 60 square kilometres (23 mi^{2}) of the Ligurian side of the range since 2007 are part of the Regional Natural Park of the Ligurian Alps. On the northern side of the range stands the Natural Park of Marguareis, another regional natural park established by the regional government of Piemonte in 1978.

== See also ==
- Apennines
- List of highest paved roads in Europe
- List of mountain passes
- Lake Raschera
- Testa Ciaudon

== Maps ==
- Italian official cartography (Istituto Geografico Militare - IGM); on-line version: www.pcn.minambiente.it
- French official cartography (Institut Géographique National - IGN); on-line version: www.geoportail.fr
