= Upper Tanaro Valley =

Valley in the Ligurian Alps, Italy and France

Coordinates: 44°15′37″N 8°1′21″E

Alta Val Tanaro
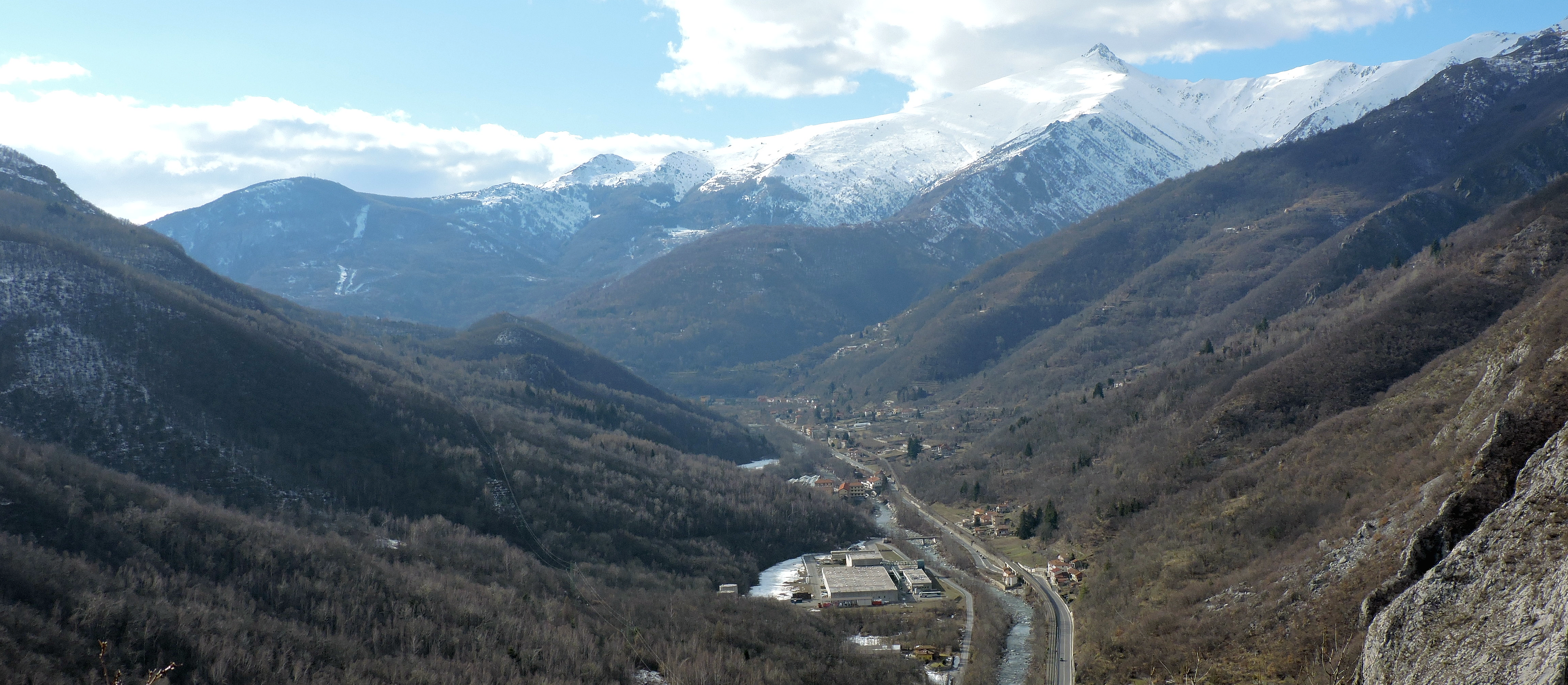
- The upper valley seen from the Barchi tower, with the snow-covered Pizzo d'Ormea in the background

Geography
- Country: Italy; France
- States/Provinces: Liguria; Piedmont; Provence-Alpes-Côte d'Azur
- Districts: Imperia; Cuneo; Savona; Alpes-Maritimes
- Population centers: La Brigue (FR-06); Briga Alta (CN); Cosio d'Arroscia (IM); Pornassio (IM); Ormea (CN); Garessio (CN); Nucetto (CN); Bagnasco (CN); Priola (CN); Perlo (CN); Battifollo (CN); Massimino (SV)
- River: Tanaro
- Interactive map of Alta Val Tanaro

The Alta Val Tanaro (Àuta Val Tani in Piedmontese, Àta Val Tan in Monregalese dialect, Ota Vol Tōnō and Ota valada du Tane in the Ligurian variants of Ormea and Garessio) is a valley in the Ligurian Alps.

== Physical geography ==
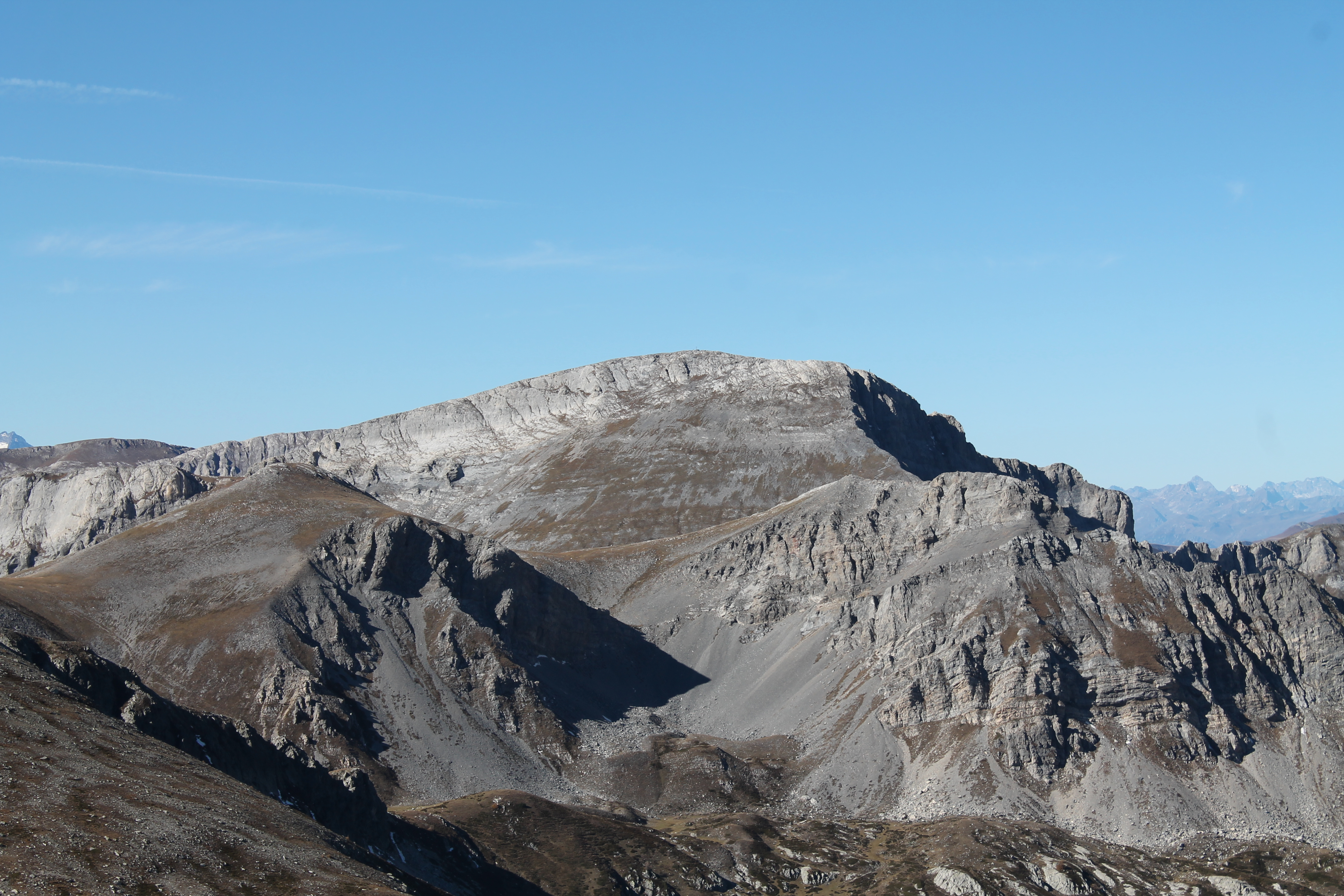
The Monte Mongioie, at the northern boundary of the valley

The Alta Val Tanaro is one of the valleys of the Ligurian Alps. The term "Alta Val Tanaro" generally refers to the mountainous part of the Tanaro river basin, located in the western portion of its course, upstream of Ceva. The territories flanking the river further east, among the hill systems of the Langhe and Monferrato, are considered the middle and lower valley of the river. The valley is bordered to the north by a mountain ridge that is part of the Marguareis Alps and separates it from the valleys of the Monregalese. To the east and southeast, it is adjacent to some tributary valleys of the Ligurian Sea: the Val Roia, the Valle Argentina, and the Valle Arroscia. To the southwest, it borders the Val Bormida. The highest peak in the Alta Val Tanaro is the Punta Marguareis (2,651 m).

== Administrative geography ==
The valley belongs almost entirely to the Province of Cuneo, in Piedmont. A small part falls within the Ligurian provinces of Savona (municipality of Massimino) and Imperia, and an even smaller portion near the border belongs to France.

The Piedmontese part of the Alta Val Tanaro was part of the Comunità montana Alta Valle Tanaro, which in 2011 merged with two other neighboring mountain communities to form the Comunità montana Alto Tanaro Cebano Monregalese. This entity was abolished, along with other Piedmontese mountain communities, by Regional Law 28 September 2012, no. 11. Subsequently, pursuant to the Regional Law of 14 March 2014, no. 3, "Law on the Mountains," the Unione Montana Alta Val Tanaro was established, comprising the municipalities of Briga Alta, Ormea, Nucetto, Perlo, Bagnasco, Priola, and Battifollo, along with Alto and Caprauna, which hydrologically belong to the Ligurian Sea basin. Since 2021, the municipality of Garessio has separated to form, together with Pamparato, the Unione Montana Valli Tanaro e Casotto. The Ligurian municipality of Massimino was administratively included in the Comunità montana Alta Val Bormida, while Cosio d'Arroscia and Pornassio are part of the Unione dei comuni dell'Alta Valle Arroscia.

== History ==
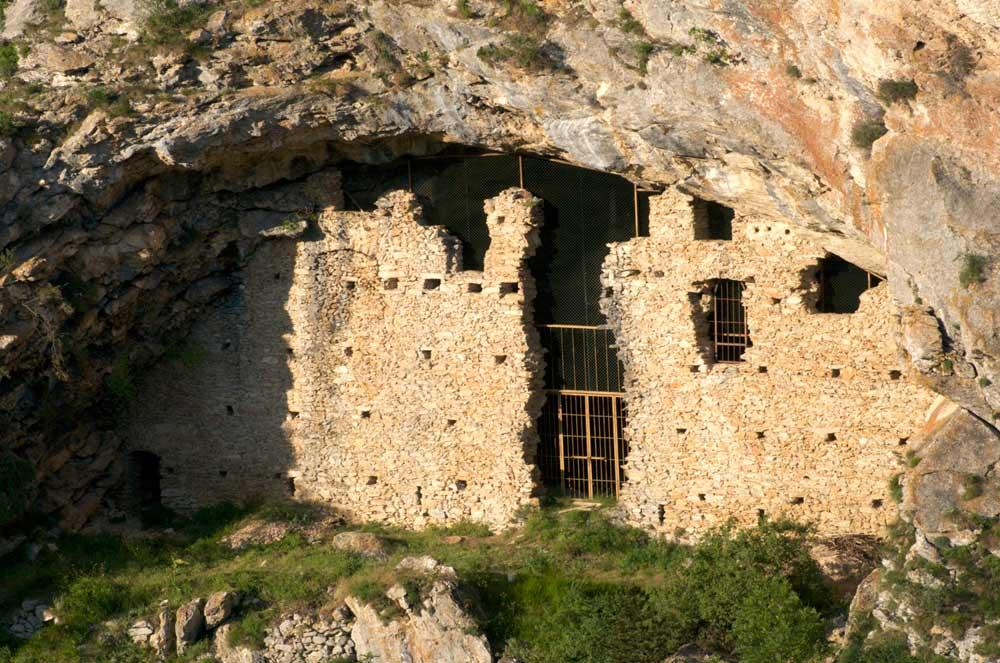
The Balma del Messere

The Val Tanaro has been inhabited since prehistoric times, as evidenced by various archaeological finds in the area. In pre-Roman times, the valley was home to populations of Ligurian origin, who left behind several toponyms traceable to their language. The Romans likely valued the valley for the thermal waters of Garessio. During the Early Middle Ages, the valley was subject to raids by the Saracens, who may have settled there in the 10th century; structures such as the cylindrical Barchi tower and the fortified cave known as the Balma del Messere have been interpreted as Saracen bases. These were defeated through a series of campaigns led by William I of Provence. In 967, Emperor Otto I granted the area as a fief to Aleramo of Montferrat; it later passed to the Marquisate of Ceva until its transfer to the Savoys in 1558.

During the Napoleonic period, the valley was heavily involved in the first and second Italian campaigns, and once the French took control of Piedmont, they decided to demolish or heavily damage some pre-existing medieval fortifications, such as the Nucetto castle, to prevent their use against them. In the second half of the 19th century, the presence of the Ceva-Ormea railway facilitated industrial development in the valley floor and the establishment of numerous businesses. During World War II, the area was the scene of various military actions, and at the end of the conflict, Garessio was among the Cities decorated with Military Valor for the Liberation War with the Bronze Medal of Military Valor, for the sacrifices of its population and its contribution to the partisan struggle.

In November 1994, the Alta Val Tanaro suffered severe damage due to the 1994 Tanaro flood caused by the Tanaro river and its tributaries; a similarly devastating flood in 1744 had already heavily damaged various buildings in the valley, such as the parish church of Garessio. Significant damage, particularly to Ormea and Garessio, was also caused by the 2016 Piedmont flood and the 2020 flood.

== Economy ==
=== Agri-food products ===
Among the typical agri-food products of the Alta Val Tanaro are the Nucetto chickpea, Furmentin buckwheat, the Bianco di Bagnasco bean, the Garessina chestnut, the Alta Val Tanaro mountain potatoes, Ottofile corn flour, and cheeses such as Sora, Ormea, and alpine Raschera. Another well-known product of the valley is San Bernardo mineral water, bottled in Garessio at a Nestlé-owned plant.

=== Industry ===
Since the second half of the 19th century, thanks to the presence of the railway, various industrial plants were established in the valley floor, some of which are still active. For example, while the Ormea paper mill ceased production after about a century and is now the subject of various reuse projects, in Garessio, several businesses remain active, including a pharmaceutical plant acquired by the multinational Sanofi-Aventis. Also significant is the Fassa Bortolo cement factory in Bagnasco and some mechanical engineering companies in Garessio.

== Transport ==
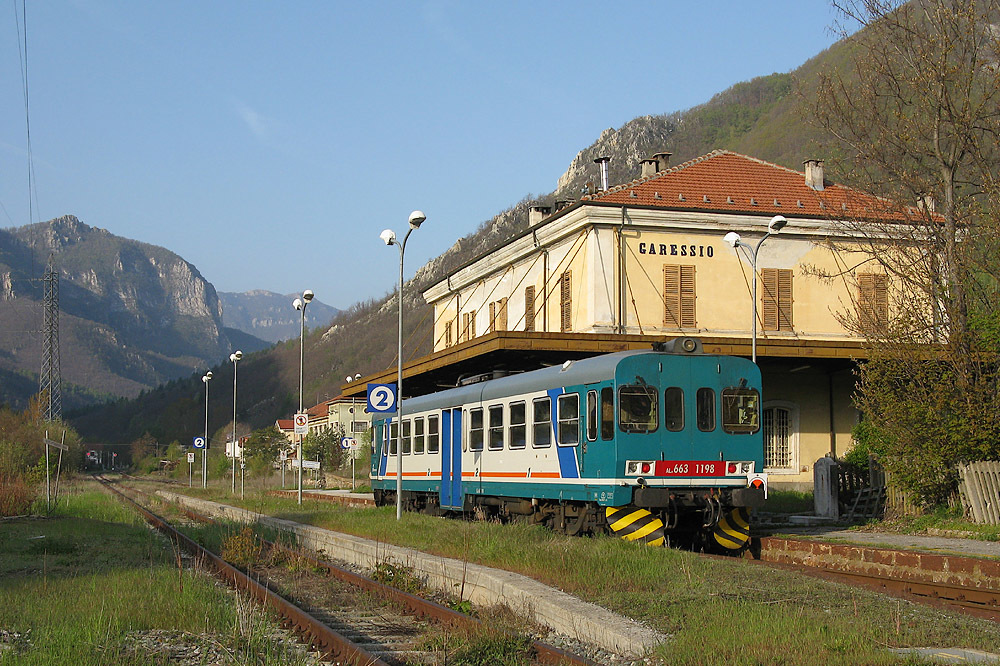
The Garessio railway station

The valley floor of the Alta Val Tanaro is served between Ceva and Ponte di Nava by the Strada statale 28 del Colle di Nava, which then turns south and, crossing the Colle di Nava, reaches Imperia. Another important road is the Strada statale 490 del Colle del Melogno, which branches off from the SS.28 at Bagnasco and, crossing the Colle dei Giovetti, also reaches the Riviera di Ponente. The Strada statale 582 del Colle di San Bernardo connects Garessio with Erli via the Colle San Bernardo. Other significant road passes connecting the Alta Val Tanaro with neighboring valleys include the Colla di Casotto (between Garessio and Pamparato), the Colle del Quazzo (between Garessio and Calizzano), and the Colle Prale (between Ormea and Caprauna).

Some towns in the valley were once served by the Ceva-Ormea railway, which now operates only as a tourist railway.

== Nature conservation ==
Much of the headwaters of the Val Tanaro in Piedmont are included in the Parco naturale del Marguareis, established in 1978 as the Parco naturale dell'Alta valle Pesio e Tanaro. The Ligurian part of the valley is partially included in the Parco naturale regionale delle Alpi Liguri; in particular, the Pian Cavallo Zone protects part of the valleys of the Tanarello and Negrone, the two source tributaries of the Tanaro. In the upper valley, there is also the SIC (Site of Community Importance) named Monte Antoroto protected area (code: IT1160035).
