= Bric of the Slave =

Mountain in the Liguirian Prealps, Italy

- Mount of the Slave
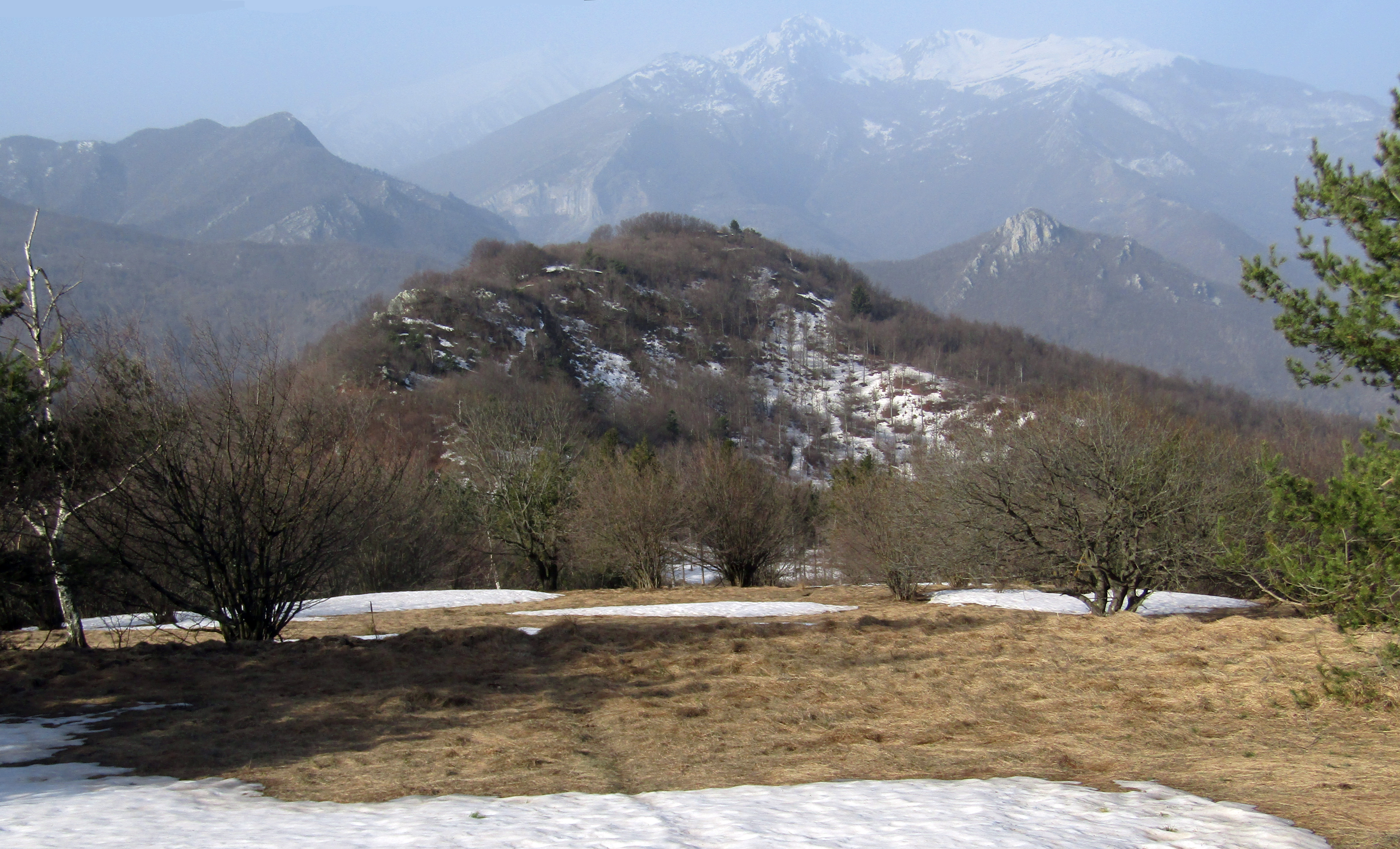
- View from Mount Cianea

Highest point
- Elevation: 1172
- Prominence: 49 m (161 ft)
- Coordinates: 44°11′N 8°03′E

Geography
- Location: Province of Cuneo, Piedmont, Italy
- Parent range: Alps

The Bric of the Slave (it: Bric dello Schiavo), formerly known as Mount of the Slave (it: Monte dello Schiavo), is a mountain in the Ligurian Prealps 1,172 m above sea level.

== Toponym ==
The name of the relief, as well as that of Passage of the Slaves (it: Passaggio degli Schiavi), by which the nearby Colle San Bernardo was once known, is said to be linked to the raids carried out by the Saracens in the Upper Tanaro Valley. Indeed, these raids often also involved the capture of local inhabitants, especially young men, who were then sold in the slave markets of Arab-controlled areas including, in particular, those of Spain.

== Geography ==
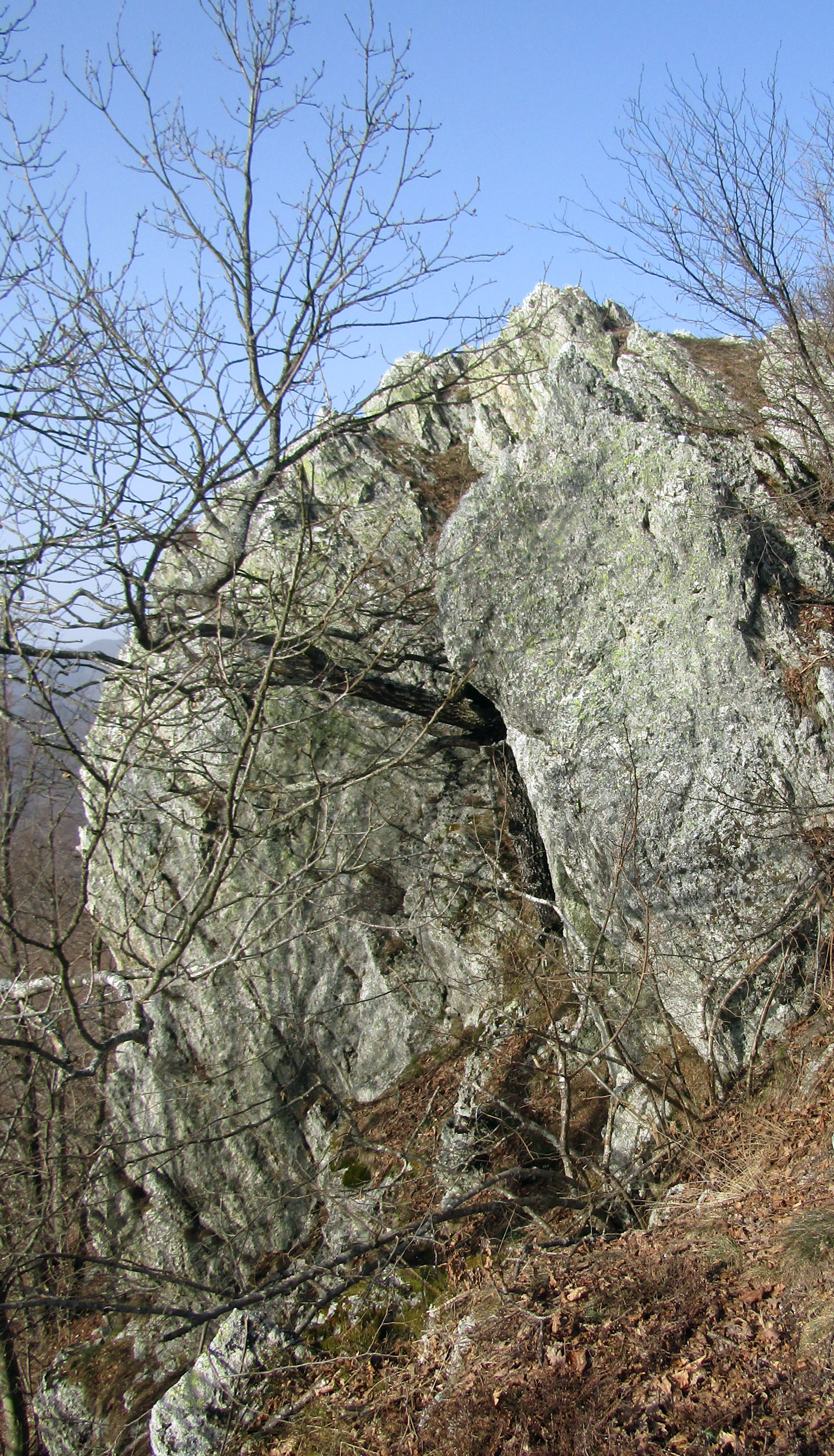
A precipitous section of the east ridge

The mountain is located on the main chain of the Alps in the municipality of Garessio, in the section where it divides Val Tanaro from Val Neva. From the summit, the main ridge proceeds in a northeastward direction, lowering to a saddle at an elevation of 1,122 m and then rising to Mount Cianea, while in the opposite direction, it lowers toward Colle San Bernardo. The Bric of the Slave, unlike other mountains in the area cloaked in deciduous forests and pastures, is partially rocky and has steep, precipitous areas. The topographic prominence of the Bric is 49 m.

== Geology ==
On the eastern slope of the Bric dello Schiavo, there is a lithological discontinuity consisting of a contact surface between a deeper granitic mass and a schist cover. In the second half of the nineteenth century some scholars, most notably Alessandro di Saluzzo di Monesiglio, proposed that the boundary between the Alps and the Apennines should pass through the Bric of the Slave for various hydrographic, geological, and historical/military considerations. Cited in favor of the proposal was that east of this mountain, the presence of granite would almost completely cease and that the Bric of the Slave represented the extreme limit of the Western Alps' defense system

== History ==
The area around the Bric was involved in the wartime operations related to Napoleon Bonaparte's Italian campaigns; the mountain was fortified as part of a defensive system that along with other works, including those on nearby Mount Cianea, defended the Colle San Bernardo and confronted the French troops stationed on Monte Galero (then known as Monte Galè). In the area between the Colle San Bernardo and Mount Cianea, a proposal to expand the wind farm already present near the pass with new wind turbines has been under discussion for some time, a project that has aroused strong opposition from various environmental associations in the area.

== Access to the summit ==
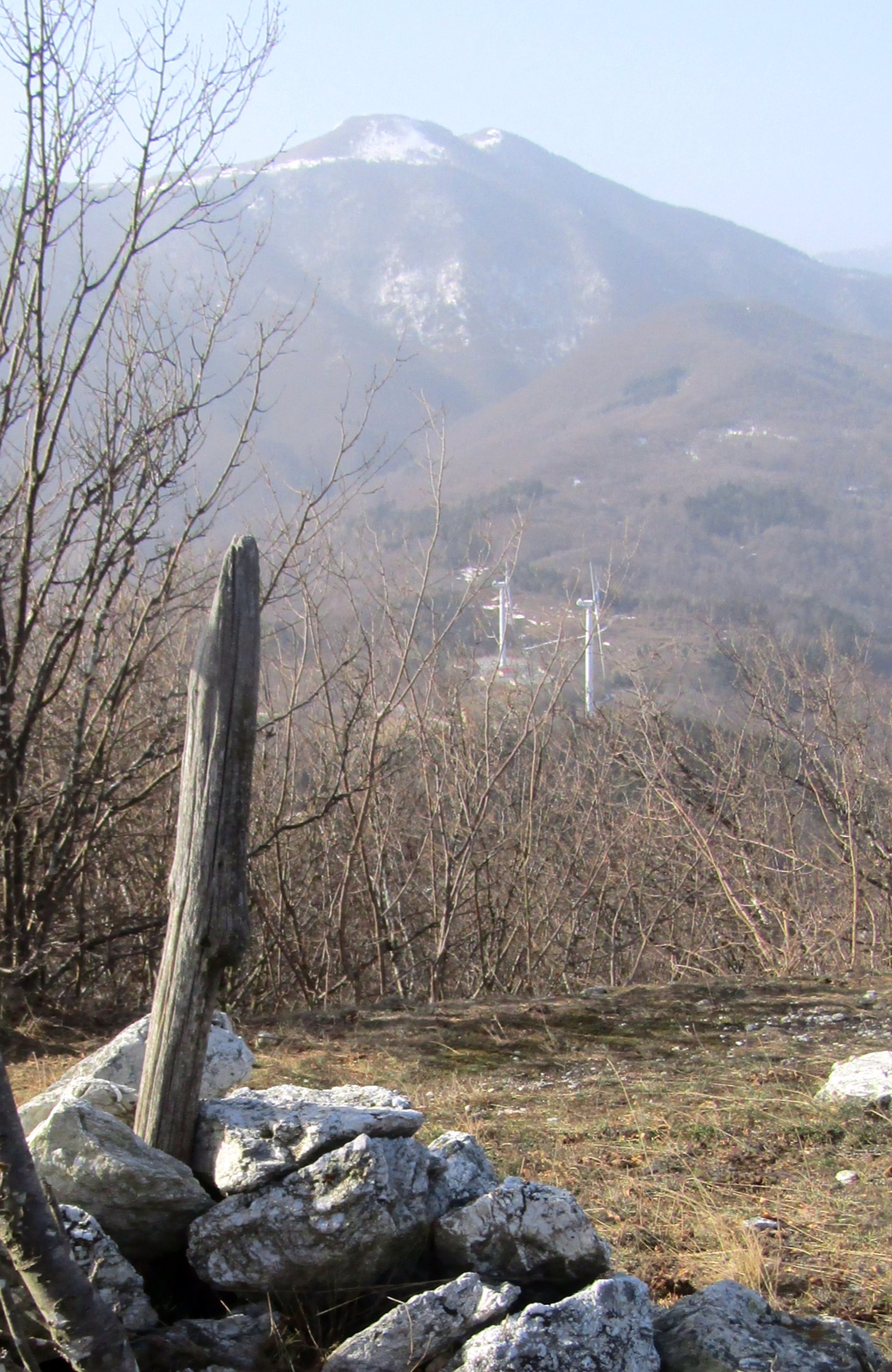
The cairn on the summit, in the background the Colle San Bernardo and Monte Galero

The Bric of The Slave can be reached by a small path that, starting from the saddle east of the mountain, passes just north of the ridge; even the ascent made directly along the ridge line does not present mountaineering difficulties, but it proves uncomfortable because of the ups and downs and the dense vegetation. The starting saddle can be reached from the Colle San Bernardo or, with a longer route, from the Colle del Quazzo. Near the mountain, on the slope facing the Ligurian Sea, the Alta Via dei Monti Liguri passes through, in the stage connecting Colle San Bernardo with Colle Scravaion.

== See also ==
- Guida dei Monti d'Italia
- Colle San Bernardo
- Colle del Quazzo
- Colle Scravaion
- Istituto Geografico Militare
- Battle of Loano
- Ligurian Alps

== Bibliography ==
- Montagna, Euro; Montaldo, Lorenzo (1981). Guida dei Monti d'Italia - Alpi Liguri [Guide to the Mountains of Italy - Ligurian Alps] (in Italian). Club Alpino Italiano - Touring Club Italiano. p. 532.
- Istituto Geografico Militare (2014). "Cartografia ufficiale italiana in scala 1:25.000 e 1:100.000" [Official Italian cartography at scales of 1:25,000 and 1:100,000]. pcn.minambiente.it (in Italian).
