= Monte Cianea =

Mountain in Italy

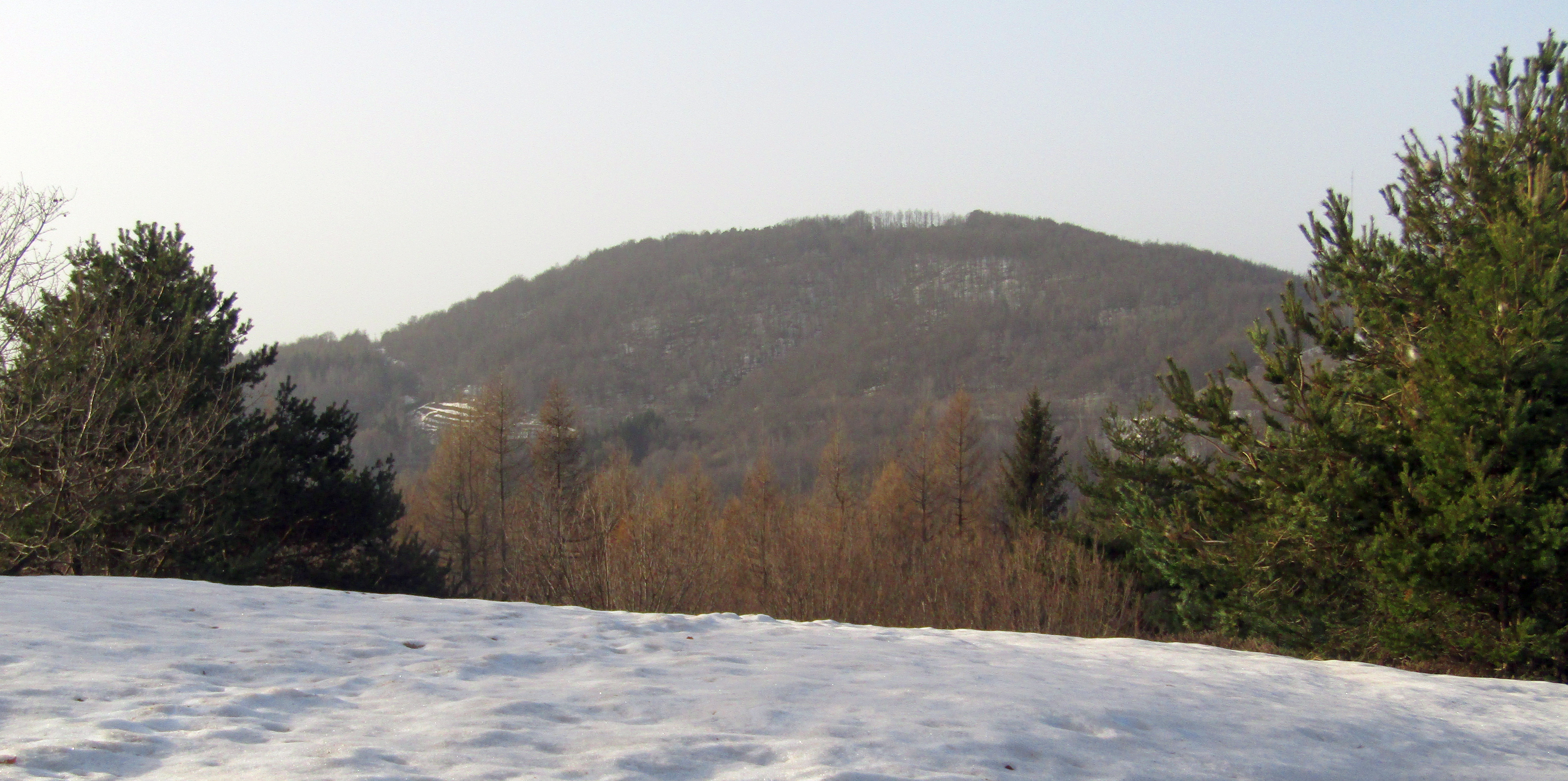
- Monte Cianea in winter

Highest point
- Elevation: 1,226 m (4,022 ft)
- Prominence: 126 m (413 ft)
- Isolation: 2.39 km (1.49 mi)
- Coordinates: 44°11′13″N 8°04′23″E

Geography
- Location within Alps
- Location: Piemonte, Italy
- Parent range: Ligurian Alps

Climbing
- First ascent: ancestral
- Easiest route: from Colle San Bernardo

Monte Cianea is a 1,226-metre (4,022 ft) mountain of the Ligurian Prealps, in Italy.

== Geography ==
The mountain belongs to the Ligurian Alps and is located in the province of Cuneo (Piedmont), close to the border with Liguria. It's located on the main chain of the Alps and is the tripoint where the drainage divides between Tanaro, Bormida and Neva valleys meet. In the SOIUSA (International Standardized Mountain Subdivision of the Alps) it belongs to the Ligurian Prealps and, within them, to Monte Carmo group and Costiera del Monte Carmo subgroup (SOIUSA code:I/A-1.I-A.2.b).

== Geology ==
The mountain is mainly made of granite rocks, which are crossed by a gneiss belt rich in minerals of the feldspar group.

== History ==
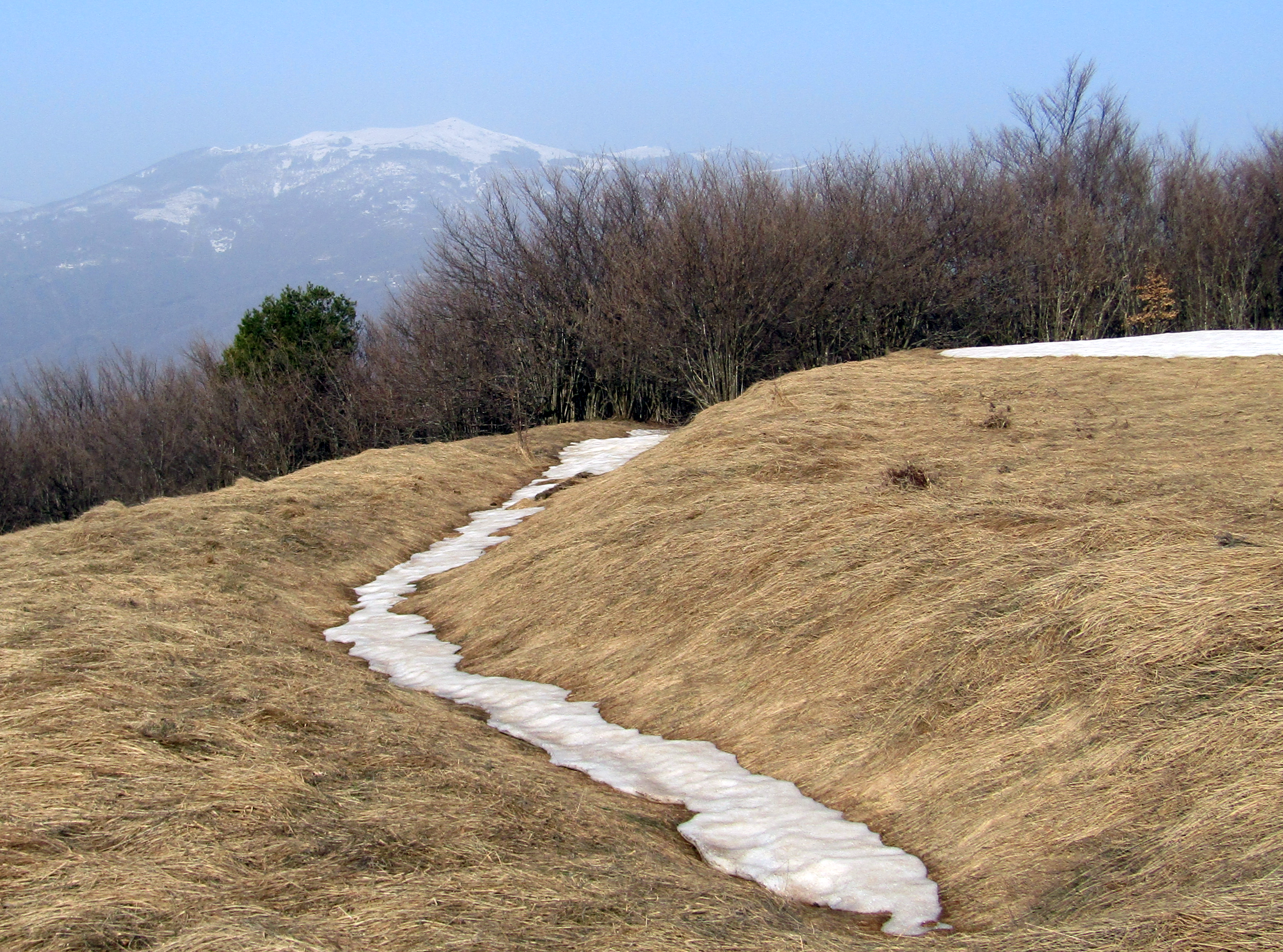
Likely old trenches remains on the Monte Cianea slopes

The area around Monte Cianea was involved in Napoleon's Italian campaign; in 1795 the Piedmontese army built there a stronghold. The area saw then violent fights because of its strategic relevance, given access to Tanaro valley and thus to the Po plain.

== Access to the summit ==
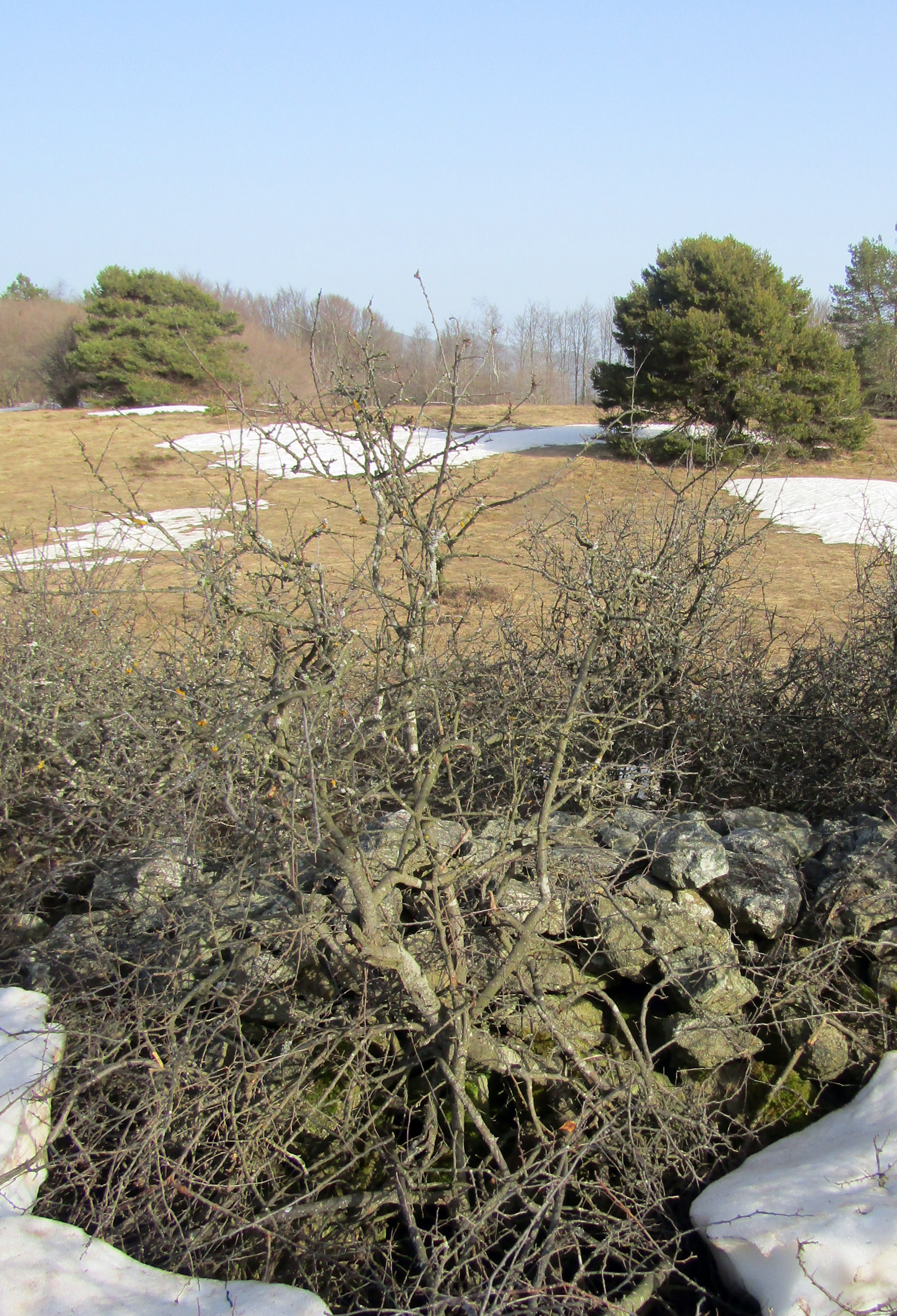
Stone pile close to the summit

The monte Cianea can be easily reached by footpath starting from different places. The route from Colle del Quazzo crosses the Colla Bassa pass, while from Colle San Bernardo the way is shorter and encircles on the Neva valley side of the neighboring (and steeper) Bric dello Schiavo. The southern slopes of Monte Cianea are crossed by the Alta Via dei Monti Liguri, in its stage linking Colle San Bernardo with Colle Scravaion.

== Bibliography ==
- Montagna, Euro; Montaldo, Lorenzo (1981). Alpi Liguri. Guida dei Monti d'Italia (in Italian). CAI-TCI.

== Maps ==
- Cartografia ufficiale italiana 1:25.000 and 1:100.000 scale (Map). Istituto Geografico Militare.
- Carta dei sentieri e stradale scala 1:25.000 n. 26 Bassa val Tanaro Val Bormida e Cebano (Map). Ciriè: Fraternali editore.
