= Monte Spinarda =

Mountain in Italy

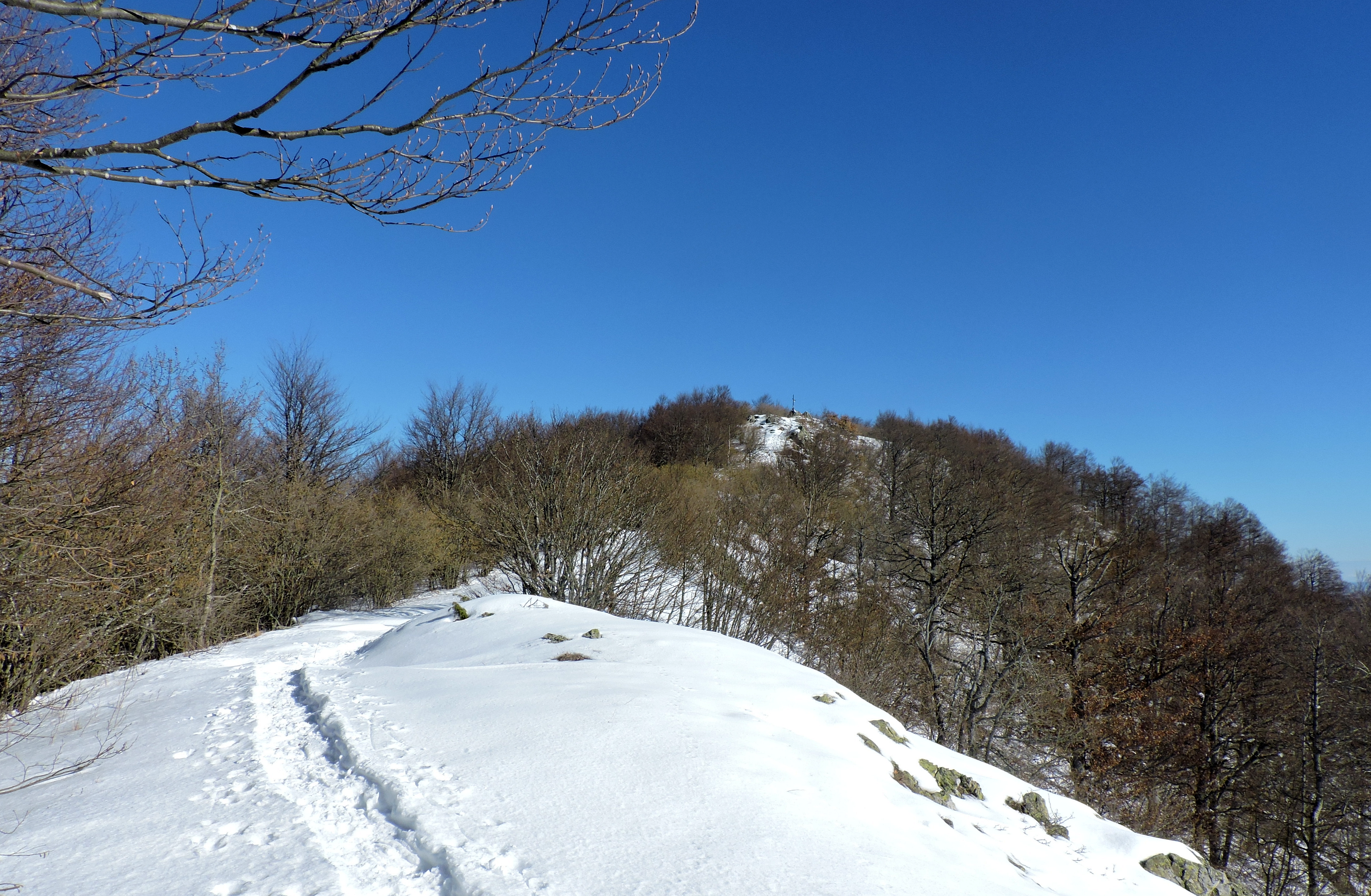
- Monte Spinarda in winter

Highest point
- Elevation: 1,357 m (4,452 ft)
- Prominence: 403 m (1,322 ft)
- Isolation: 8.91 km (5.54 mi)
- Coordinates: 44°13′39.47″N 08°04′10.52″E

Geography
- Location within Alps
- Location: Liguria/Piemonte, Italy
- Parent range: Ligurian Alps

Climbing
- First ascent: ancestral
- Easiest route: from Colle del Quazzo or Calizzano

Monte Spinarda is a 1,357-metre (4,452 ft) mountain of the Ligurian Prealps in Italy.

== Geography ==
The mountain belongs to the Ligurian Alps and is located between the province of Savona (Liguria, south) and the province of Cuneo (Piedmont, north). Monte Spinarda is the tripoint where the Ligurian comune of Calizzano and the Piedmontese ones of Garessio and Priola meet. Is located very close to the drainage divide between Tanaro and Bormida valleys, on the Bormida valley side, a very long ridge which branches from the Main chain of the Alps at Monte Cianea. In the SOIUSA (International Standardized Mountain Subdivision of the Alps) Monte Spinarda belongs to the Ligurian Prealps and, within them, to Monte Carmo group and Dorsale Spinarda-Sotta subgroup (SOIUSA code:I/A-1.I-A.2.b).

== Geology ==
The Anfiboliti di monte Spinarda, an outcrop of amphibolites recorded in the Italian official geological map, was named after the mountain.

== History ==
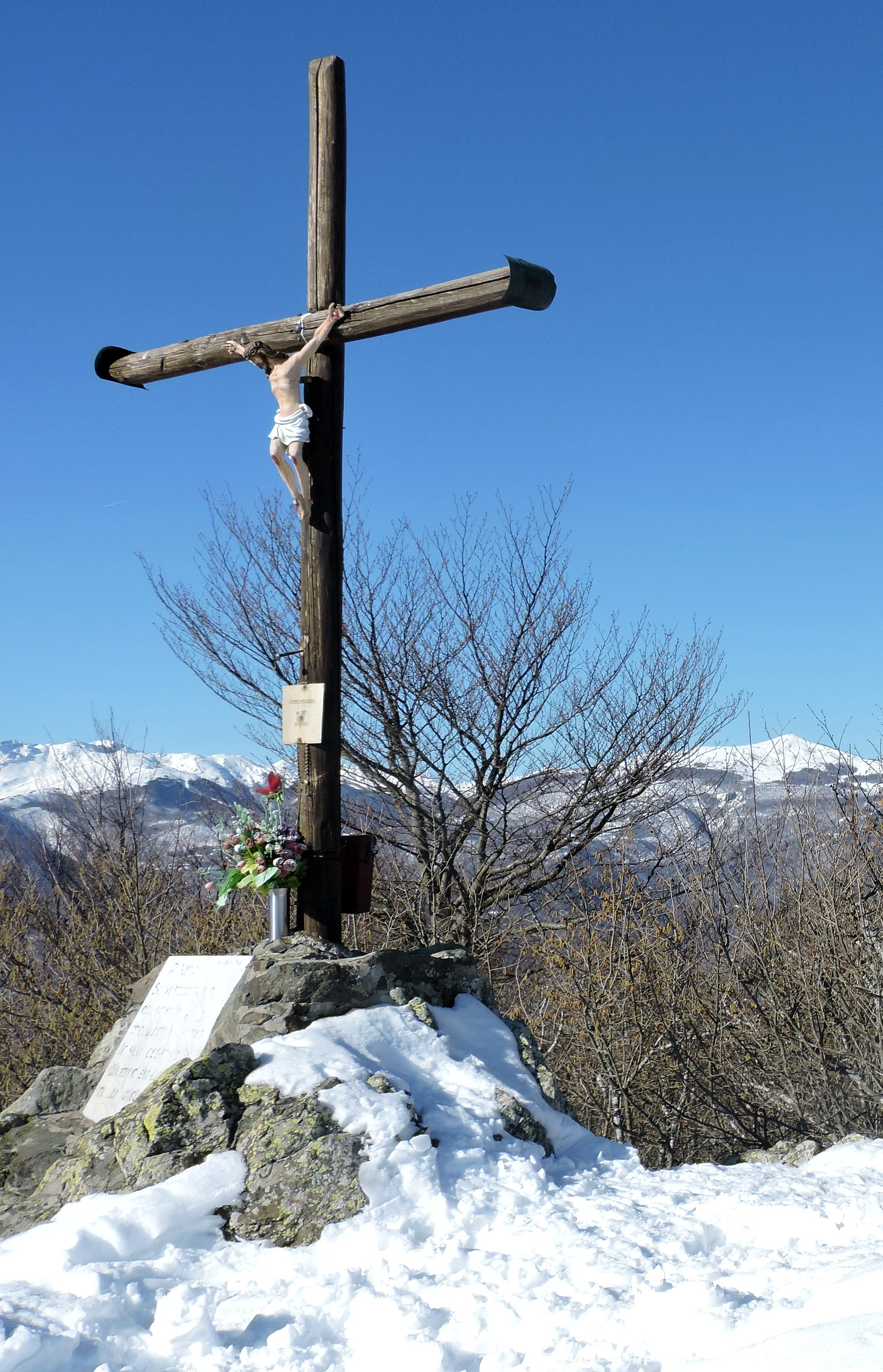
Summit cross

The area surrounding Monte Spinarda was involved in wartime operations linked to the Italian campaigns of Napoleon Bonaparte, and in 1799 the French Army occupied its summit. Nearby, in a place called Vignale, during the 19th century mineralogists found some gold in the form of sulphate.

== Access to the summit ==
The summit of Monte Spinarda can be easily reached on foot by Colle del Quazzo or, with a longer walk, from Calizzano. During snowy winters the summit can also be accessed with snowshoes. The hike is appreciated not only for the good views on the surrounding mountains, but also for its low risk of avalanches.

== Conservation ==
Monte Spinarda slopes are mainly covered with beech woods and shrubs. Its Ligurian side belongs to the SIC (Site of Community Importance) called Monte Spinarda - Rio Nero - code IT1323014.

== Maps ==
- Cartografia ufficiale italiana scale 1:25.000 and 1:100.000 (Map). Istituto Geografico Militare.
- Carta dei sentieri e stradale scala 1:25.000 n. 26 Bassa val Tanaro Val Bormida e Cebano (Map). Ciriè: Fraternali editore.
