= Alessandro Lupo =

Italian painter

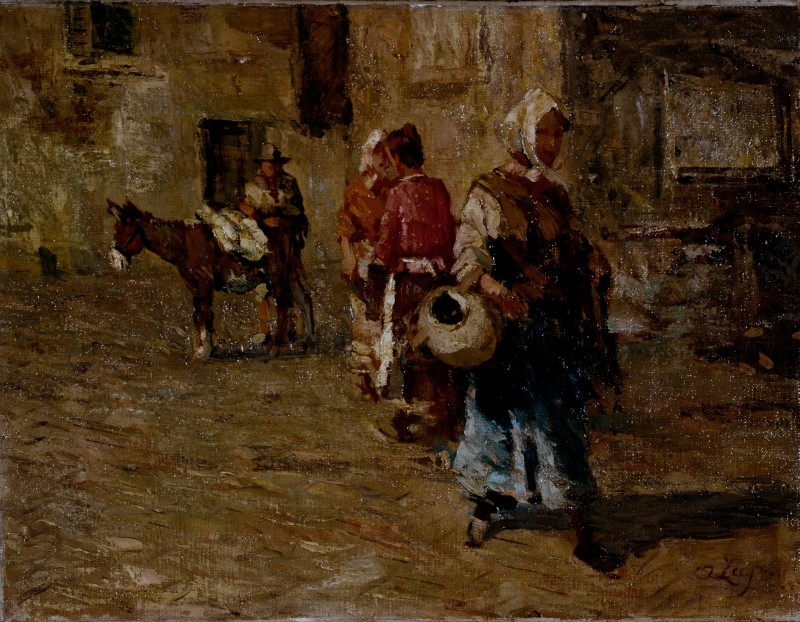
Andando al mercato (Going to the market), 1930–1935 (Art collections of Fondazione Cariplo)

Alessandro Lupo (1876–1953) was an Italian painter.

== Biography ==
Lupo was born in Turin. His family had intended for him a career in law, and he graduated in 1900.

Lupo developed artistically under the guidance of Vittorio Cavalleri, and also attended night courses at the Accademia Albertina. He worked within the tradition of late 19th-century Piedmontese Naturalism, influenced in his landscapes by the works of Delleani. His debut at the Turin Società Promotrice di Belle Arti in 1901 with three studies from life was followed by regular participation in the major national events. Though criticised for excessive adherence to the models of his master, his work attracted the attention of the public and critics from 1908 on. The early landscapes painted en plein air gave way to a broader range of subjects until he began to specialise in market scenes and animals during the 1920s. The artist's success in terms of exhibitions and reviews, beginning with the solo show of 1921 at the Galleria Vinciana, Milan, came to an abrupt end when he was excluded from the Venice Biennale of 1928. However, he continued to exhibit abroad. Long-term commercial success was nevertheless ensured by the pleasant character of the subjects addressed and a penchant for outmoded 19th-century stylistic mannerisms.

== Other projects ==
Media related to Alessandro Lupo at Wikimedia Commons
