= Giovanni Colmo =

Italian painter

Giovanni Colmo (1867–1947) was an Italian painter, active mainly as a landscape painter.

Giovanni was born in Turin; he first studied engineering but gravitated to painting without a formal education. He was an older brother of Eugenio Colmo, known as Golia, a noted cartoonist, caricaturist and watercolorist. Giovanni lived for many years in Garessio. He was part of the outdoor school of landscape painters called the School of Rivara. This latter group painted outdoors on scene, and were interested in capturing seasons, times, and weather. Among his colleagues in painting mainly the Piedmontese alpine valleys were Anselmo Sacerdote, Vittorio Cavalleri and Carlo Pollonera.
