= Anselmo Sacerdote =

Italian painter, engraver, and photographer

Anselmo Sacerdote (1868–1926) was an Italian painter, engraver, and photographer. For 23 years, he served as secretary-conservator at the Museo Civico of Turin (predecessor of the present Museo Civico d'Arte Antica). He mainly painted landscapes.

== Biography ==
Sacerdote was born in Turin, and first apprenticed in the studio of Vittorio Avondo, director of the museum until 1910. In 1900, Sacerdote began exhibiting at the Società Promotrice delle Belle Arti, and in 1903, when he joined the group, at the Turinese Circle of Artists.

Sacerdote was influenced by local landscape painters including Lorenzo Delleani and the so-called School of Rivara. This latter group painted outdoors on scene, and were interested in capturing seasons, times, and weather. Among his colleagues in painting mainly the Piedmontese alpine valleys, were Vittorio Cavalleri, Giovanni Colmo, and Carlo Pollonera.

With his camera, he often took pictures to help his painting. He also documented many sites of the medieval architecture still extant in his time.
