= Mario Gachet =

Italian painter (1879–1981)

Mario Gachet (15 August 1879 – 18 February 1981) was an Italian painter, mainly depicting landscapes in his native Piedmont.

== Biography ==
Gachet was born in Piazza Statuto in Turin to a family originally from Saint-Étienne in central France. His father was a lawyer and owner of a velvet fabric factory. His father was a supporter of the arts, and a close friend of the painter Vittorio Cavalleri. Cavalleri mentored the young Mario into the circles of the Accademia Albertina. By 1902, he exhibited at the Mostre quadriennali of Turin, sponsored by the local Circolo degli Artisti. In 1969, he was named dean of painters of this association. In 1911, he had a personal exhibition in London. Among the works in 1914 were Pagine d’amore and Anime e Dio.

His personal life had significant tragedies. Married in 1899, his wife would die four years later. His only son, Benvenuto (1900–1928) died young. By 1923, an article in “Il Piemonte” described his submissions to the 25th Mostra degli Amici dell’Arte as melancholic paintings...they lament the abandoned desolation of things. He is a landscape artist of rare efficacy, a spiritual one: in which nature draws a mysterious assent and a creative urge of poetry The journalist Vera Manuelle said of his work: here are all the riches of nature that speak of the soul, but which the soul has not enough time to listen.

In 1949, he left his father's home on Via Tripoli to move to a small rural house in Castiglione Torinese. He died at the age of 101, lucid and aided by his sister.
