= Monte Antoroto =

Mountain in Italy

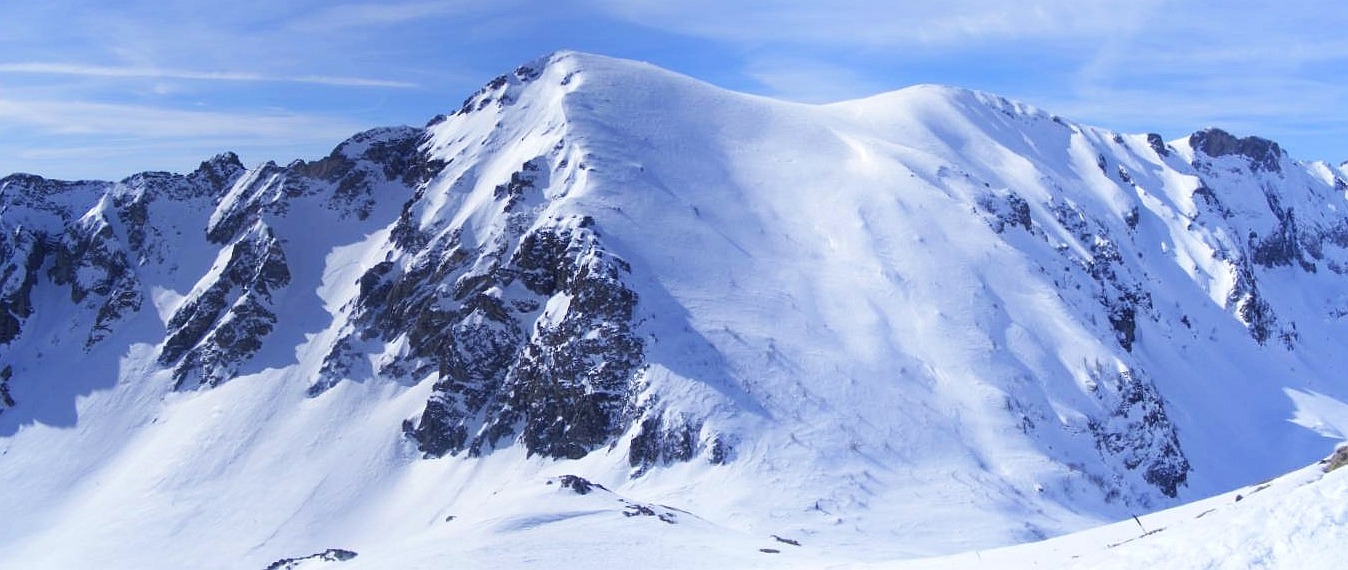
- Monte Antoroto as seen from Monte Grosso

Highest point
- Elevation: 2,144 m (7,034 ft)
- Coordinates: 44°11′18″N 7°54′41″E

Geography
- Location within Alps
- Location: Piemonte, Italy
- Parent range: Ligurian Alps

Geology
- Rock type: limestone

Climbing
- First ascent: ancestral
- Easiest route: hiking

The Monte Antoroto is a mountain of the Ligurian Alps located in Piedmont (NW Italy).

== Geography ==
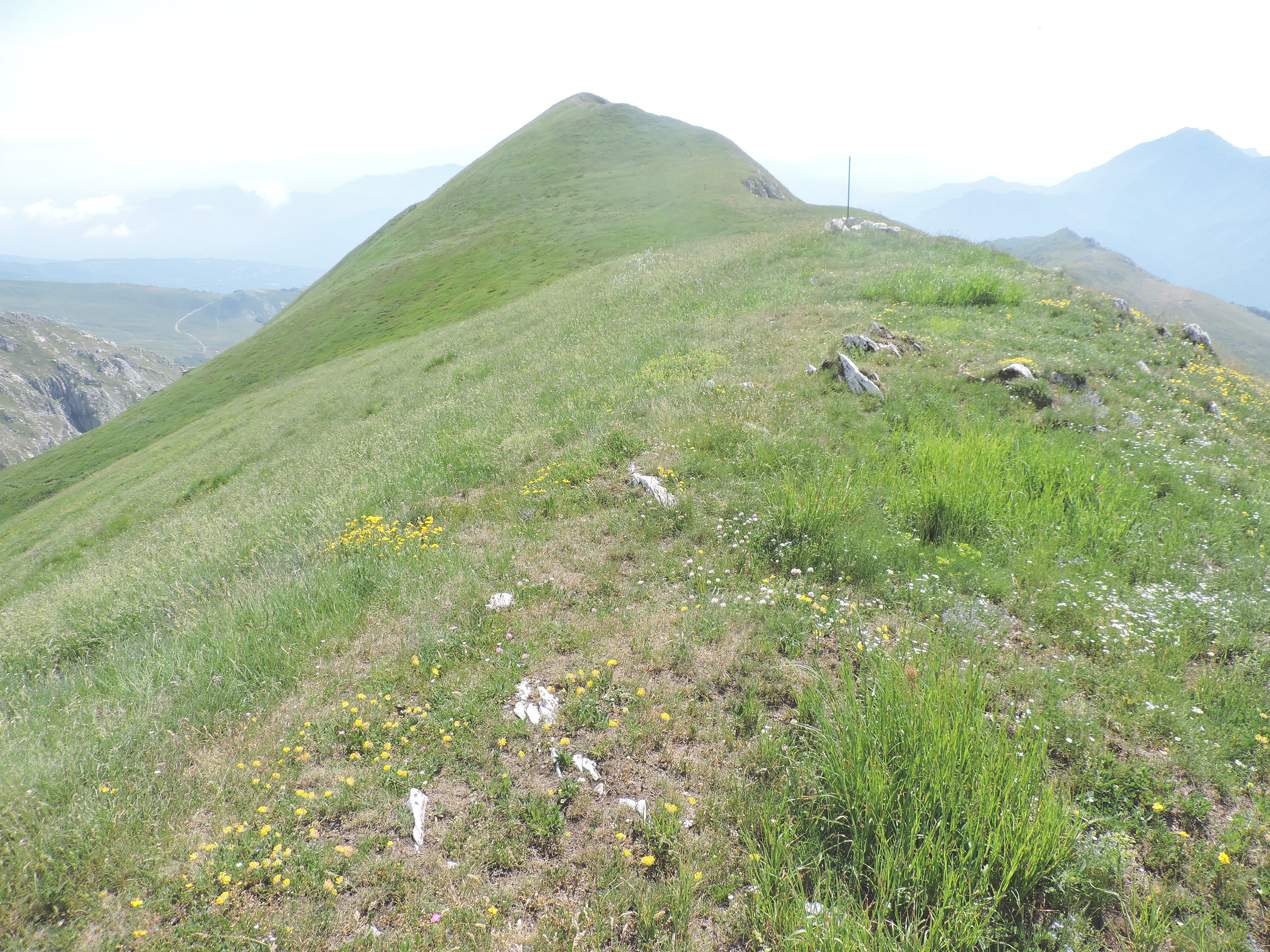
Western subsummit

The mountain is located on the watershed between the upper Valley of Tanaro and the Casotto valley. The Colla Bassa saddle (1,851 m) divides it from Monte Grosso (East), while westwards the ridge goes on with Cima Ciuaiera (2,175 m) and Colla dei Termini. Close to the summit of the Monte Antoroto stands a rounded and grassy subsummit, some metres lower than the main summit.

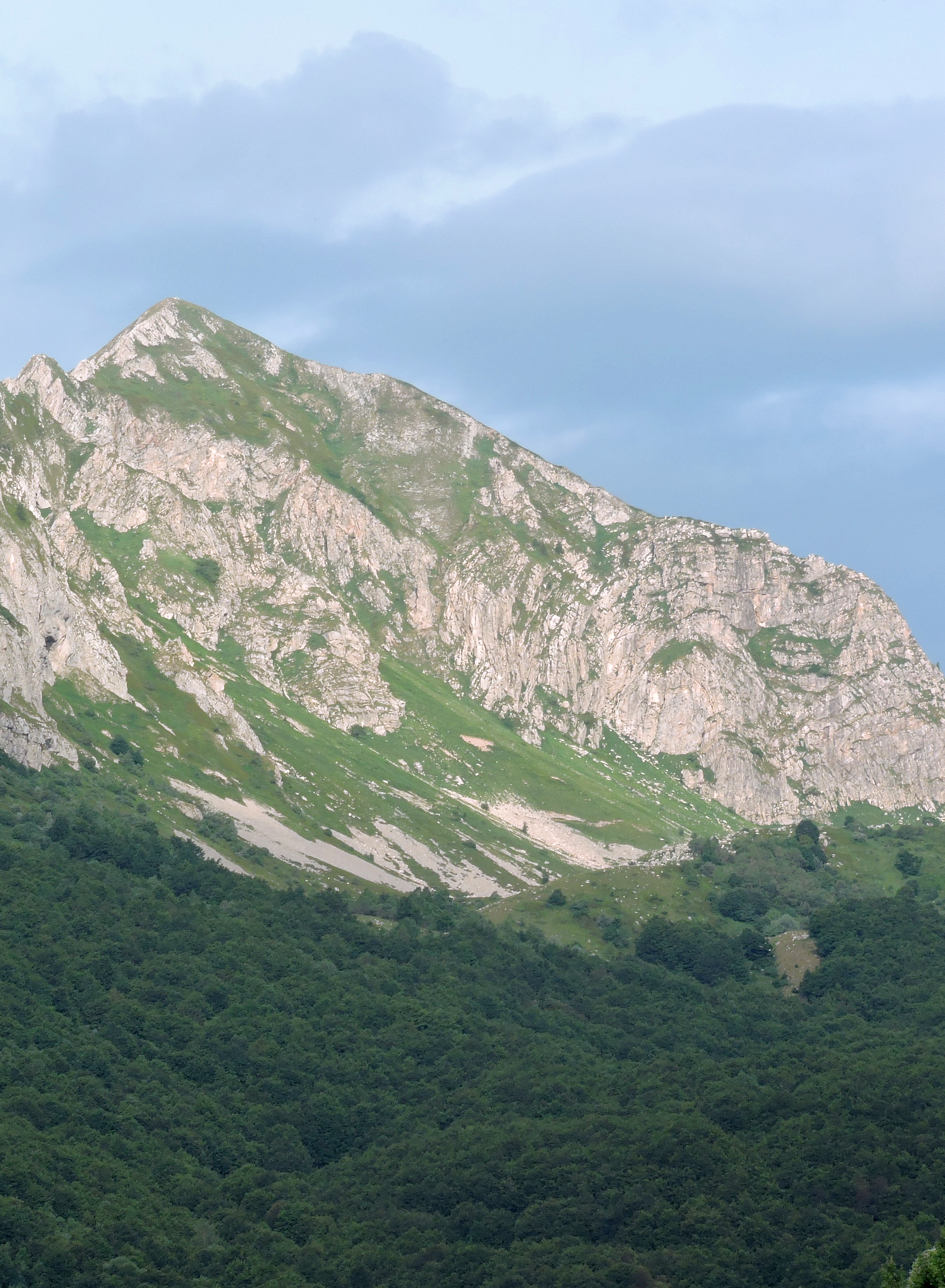
View from Valdinferno

The mountain is mainly made of sedimentary limestone, as usual in the Ligurian Alps. Monte Antoroto is clearly visible from Valdinferno (comune of Garessio) and from Ormea, which stands at the feet of its overhanging southern cliffs.

=== SOIUSA classification ===
According to the SOIUSA (International Standardized Mountain Subdivision of the Alps) the mountain can be classified in the following way:

- main part = Western Alps
- major sector = South Western Alps
- section = Ligurian Alps
- subsection = It:Alpi del Marguareis/Fr:Alpes Liguriennes Occidentales
- supergroup = It:Catena Marguareis-Mongioie/Fr:Chaîne Marguareis-Mongioie
- group = It:Gruppo Pizzo d'Ormea-Monte Antoroto
- subgroup = It:Costiera Bric di Conolia-Pizzo d'Ormea
- code = I/A-1.II-B.5.a

== Nature conservation ==
The Monte Antoroto belongs to a S.C.I. also named Monte Antoroto (cod. IT1160035), whose specific conservation rules were approved by the Regione Piemonte in 2016.

== Access to the summit ==
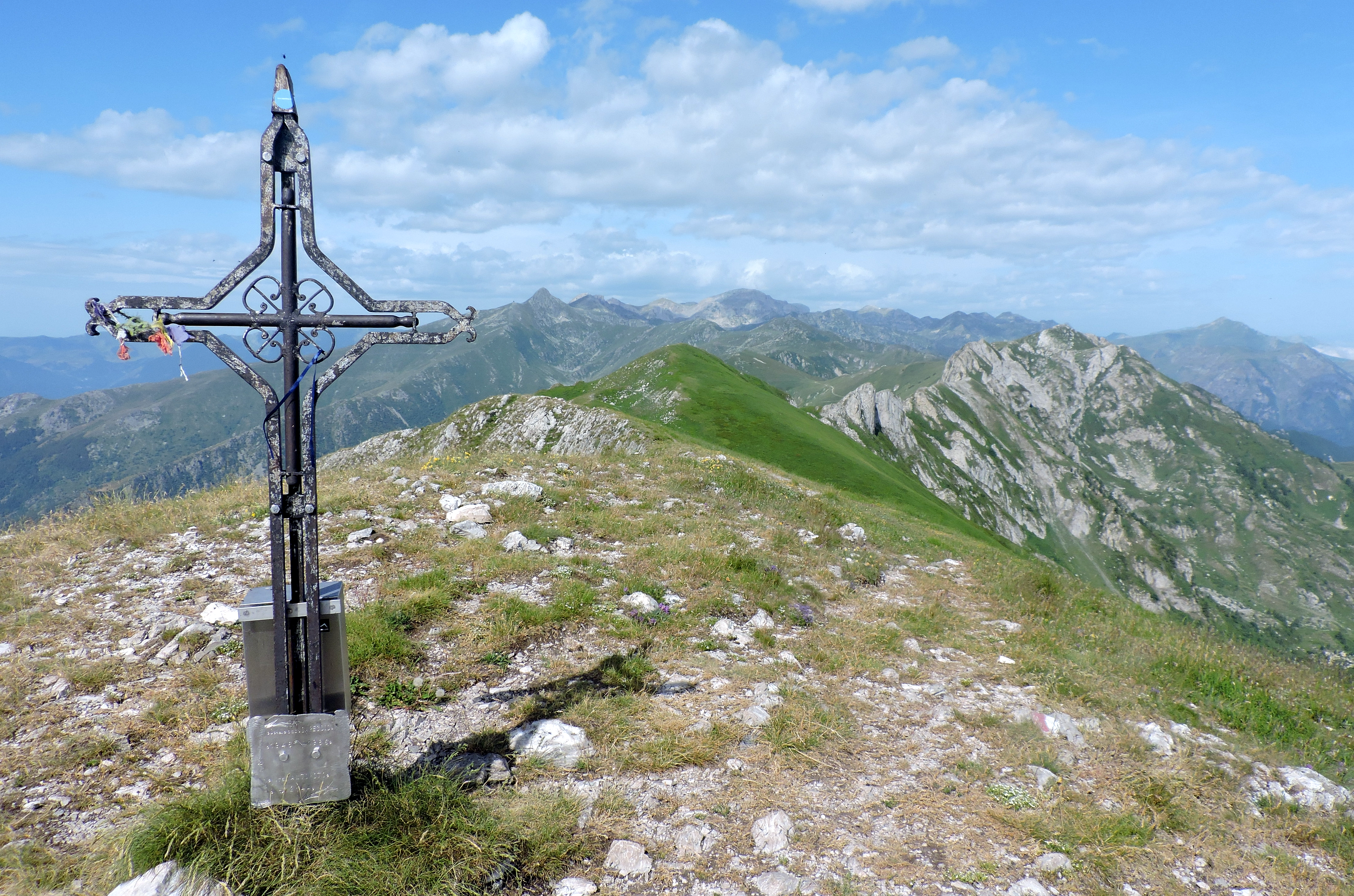
Summit cross

The Monte Antoroto can be reached from Valcasotto following a waymarked footpath with a vertical climb of about 1,200 m. A slightly shorter hiking itinerary starts from Valdinferno, a village belonging to the Garessio comune. The summit offers a very broad view on Western Alps and Ligurian Apennine. In good weather conditions also on the Ligurian Sea and Golfo di Genova can be seen behind the Ligurian Prealps (Armetta-Galero ridge).

== Mountain huts ==
- Rifugio Angelo Manolino
- Rifugio Savona, near Valdinferno.

== Maps ==
- Cartografia ufficiale italiana in scala 1:25.000 e 1:100.000 (Map). Istituto Geografico Militare.
- Carta in scala 1:50.000 n. 8 Alpi Marittime e Liguri (Map). Torino: Istituto Geografico Centrale.
- Carta dei sentieri e stradale scala 1:25.000 n. 22 Mondovì Val Ellero Val Maudagna Val Corsaglia Val Casotto (Map). Ciriè: Fraternali editore.
