= Reggia di Val Casotto =

Former royal residence in Italy

Coordinates: 44.230069°N 7.924761°E

The Reggia di Val Casotto, or Valcasotto is a former royal residence located in Garessio, region of Piedmont, Italy.

== History ==
A structure at the site was founded in the 11th century as the Certosa di San Brunone (Charterhouse of St Bruno) housing monks of the cloistered Carthusian order. They were finally expelled by the invading French forces at the end of the 18th century. Earlier in the 18th century, under the direction of the architects Francesco Gallo and Bernardo Vittone, part had been refurbished into a rural palace. In 1837, King Charles Albert of Sardinia refurbished it again, accentuating the castle like elements. King Victor Emmanuel II used the palace as a hunting lodge. The residence is one of the Residenze Sabaude considered by UNESCO a World Heritage Site. The buildings are undergoing a prolonged restoration, and not open to visitors.
