= Eugenio Colmo =

Italian painter (1885–1967)

Eugenio Colmo, known by the pseudonym Golia (1885–1967) was an Italian cartoonist, caricaturist and watercolor painter.

Giovanni was born in Turin to a father who worked for the railroad offices. He was the younger brother of the painter Giovanni Colmo. Eugenio lived for many years in Garessio. At elementary school he befriended the poet Guido Gozzano and Tancredi Vigliardi Paravia. He enrolled to study law, but abandoned his studies to become an artist, beginning his career by writing for satirical journals Due di picche and 'Torino ride published in Turin, and the journal Ma chi è?. Between 1904 and 1906, he directed the journal Pasquino. In 1911, he organized an international exhibition of cartoon art held at the same time as the Turin Exposition held on the 50th anniversary of the establishment of Italy.

During the years after the first world war, he continued his activity as a humorist, but also made posters and ceramic designs. Between 1941 and 1944, he confronted a number of tragedies: his wife committed suicide, his house and studio were destroyed during bombardments, and he lacked commissions. After the war, he found employment with the Gazzetta del Popolo in Turin.

A museum in his honor has established in Garessio.
