= Nucetto =

- Comune
- Comune di Nucetto
- Location within Italy Location within Piedmont
- Coordinates: 44°20′N 8°4′E
- Country: Italy
- Region: Piedmont
- Province: Province of Cuneo (CN)
- Frazioni: Villa, Nicolini, Caramelli, Livrato, Cadirei, Roatta, Stra' veia

Area
  - Total: 7.6 km^{2} (2.9 sq mi)
- Elevation: 450 m (1,480 ft)

Population (Dec. 2004)
  - Total: 451
  - Density: 59/km^{2} (150/sq mi)
- Demonym: Nucettesi
- Time zone: UTC+1 (CET)
  - Summer (DST): UTC+2 (CEST)
- Postal code: 12070
- Dialing code: 0174

Nucetto is a comune (municipality) in the Province of Cuneo in the Italian region Piedmont, located about 90 kilometres (56 mi) southeast of Turin and about 40 kilometres (25 mi) east of Cuneo. As of 31 December 2004, it had a population of 451 and an area of 7.6 square kilometres (2.9 mi^{2}).

The municipality of Nucetto contains the frazioni (subdivisions, mainly villages and hamlets) Villa, Nicolini, Caramelli, Livrato, Cadirei, Roatta, and Stra' veia.

Nucetto borders the following municipalities: Bagnasco, Battifollo, Ceva, and Perlo.

== Demographic evolution ==
Historical population

Year	Pop.	±%
1861	750	—
1871	837	+11.6%
1881	833	−0.5%
1901	860	+3.2%
1911	867	+0.8%

Year	Pop.	±%
1921	1,002	+15.6%
1931	869	−13.3%
1936	795	−8.5%
1951	707	−11.1%
1961	552	−21.9%

Year	Pop.	±%
1971	495	−10.3%
1981	479	−3.2%
1991	461	−3.8%
2001	473	+2.6%

Source: Data from ISTAT
