= Massimino =

- Comune
- Comune di Massimino
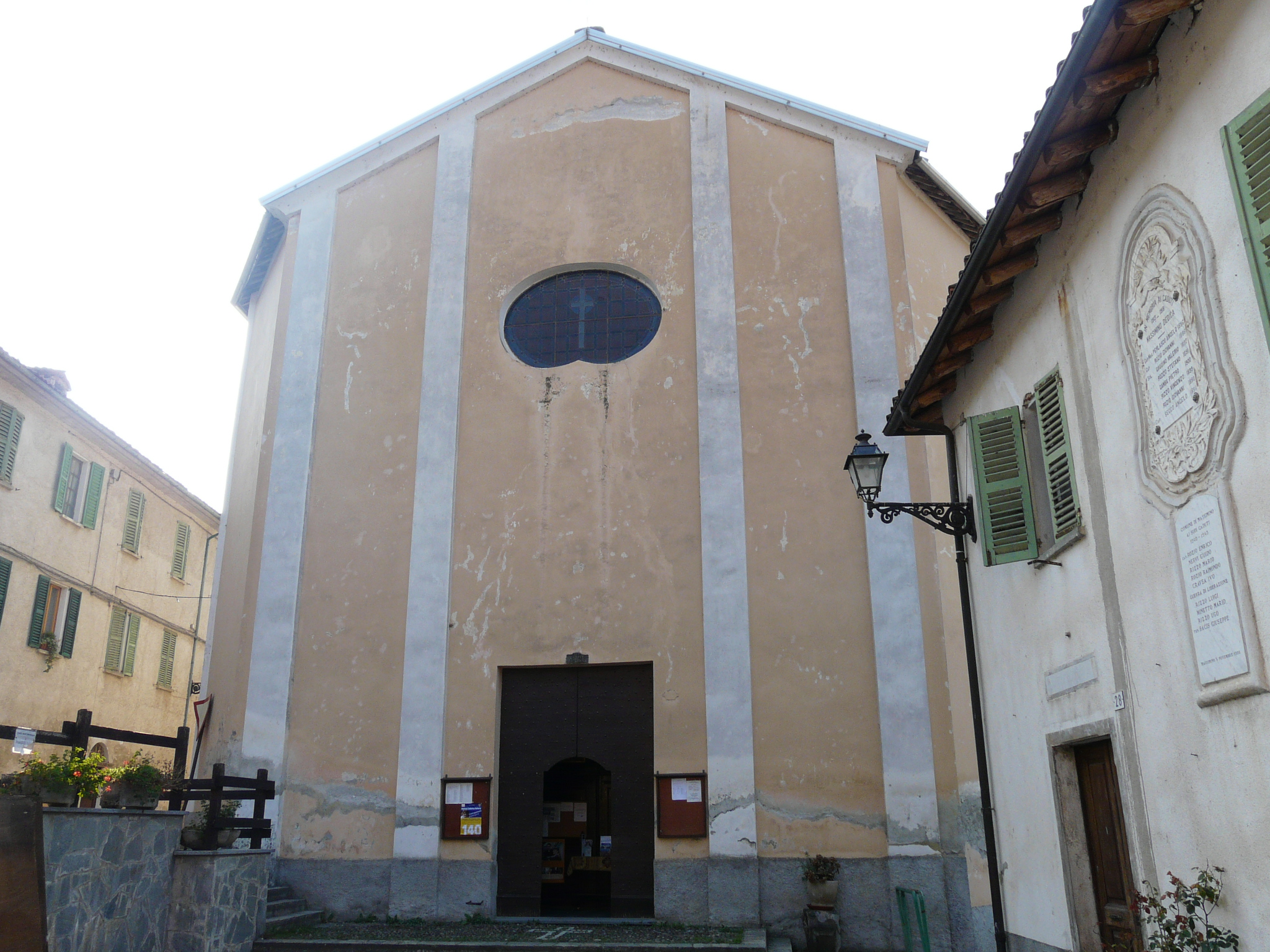
- Saint Donatus Church

- Location within Italy Location within Liguria
- Coordinates: 44°18′N 8°4′E
- Country: Italy
- Region: Liguria
- Province: Savona (SV)
- Frazioni: San Vincenzo, San Pietro, Selagni, Cerri, Costa, Villa Muraglia

Government
  - Mayor: Massimo Paoletta

Area
  - Total: 7.85 km^{2} (3.03 sq mi)
- Elevation: 540 m (1,770 ft)

Population (31 December 2017)
  - Total: 103
  - Density: 13.1/km^{2} (34.0/sq mi)
- Demonym: Massimesi
- Time zone: UTC+1 (CET)
  - Summer (DST): UTC+2 (CEST)
- Postal code: 12071
- Dialing code: 019
- Website: Official website

Massimino (Ligurian: Mascimin; Piedmontese: Massimin) is the smallest municipality in the Province of Savona in the Italian region Liguria, located about 70 kilometres (43 mi) west of Genoa and about 35 kilometres (22 mi) west of Savona.

The municipality of Massimino contains the frazioni (subdivisions, mainly villages and hamlets) San Vincenzo, San Pietro, Selagni, Cerri, Costa, and Villa Muraglia.

Massimino borders the following municipalities: Bagnasco, Calizzano, Murialdo, and Perlo.

== History ==
The origin of Massimino, as the name reveals, is linked to the medieval foundation of the Benedictine grange of San Massimo, built on a hill above the village. Being a border town, it had to accommodate gangs of smugglers and brigands who from Piedmont sought refuge in the marquisate. Possession of the marquises of Ceva who ceded it after 1260 to the Del Carretto of Finale, then subdued the Spanish rule and in 1713 was purchased by Genoa for its strategic position in control of the Via dei Giovetti.
