= Bagnasco =

- Comune
- Comune di Bagnasco
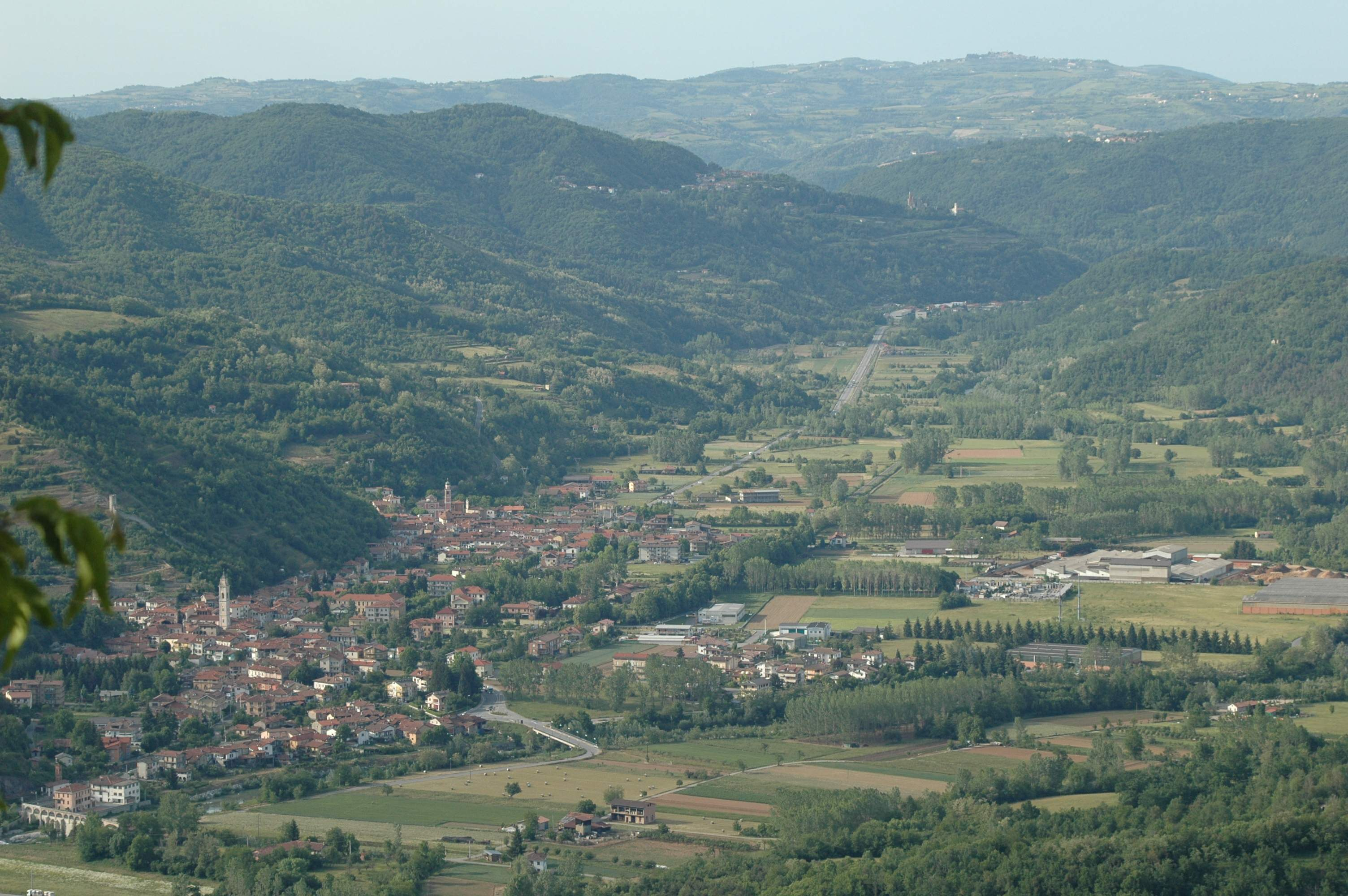

- Location within Italy Location within Piedmont
- Coordinates: 44°18′N 8°3′E
- Country: Italy
- Region: Piedmont
- Province: Cuneo (CN)

Government
  - Mayor: Mauro Bertino

Area
  - Total: 30.95 km^{2} (11.95 sq mi)
- Elevation: 483 m (1,585 ft)

Population (30 April 2017)
  - Total: 1,024
  - Density: 33.09/km^{2} (85.69/sq mi)
- Demonym: Bagnaschesi
- Time zone: UTC+1 (CET)
  - Summer (DST): UTC+2 (CEST)
- Postal code: 12071
- Dialing code: 0174
- Website: Official website

Bagnasco is a comune (municipality) in the Province of Cuneo in the Italian region Piedmont, located about 90 kilometres (56 mi) southeast of Turin and about 40 kilometres (25 mi) east of Cuneo.

Bagnasco borders the following municipalities: Battifollo, Calizzano, Lisio, Massimino, Nucetto, Perlo, Priola, and Viola.
