= Vittorio Cavalleri =

Italian painter (1860–1938)

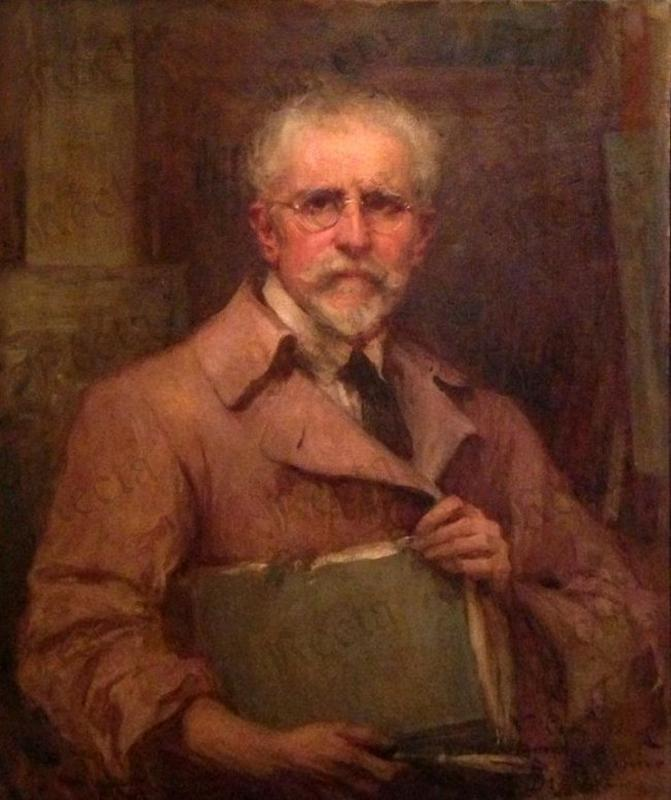
Self-portrait

Vittorio Cavalleri or Cavalieri (16 February 1860 – 1938) was an Italian painter. He mainly painted outdoor genre scenes.

Cavalleri was born in Turin. In 1878, he enrolled in the Accademia Albertina, where he studied under Enrico Gamba, Andrea Gastaldi, and Pier Celestino Gilardi. In 1884, he exhibited in the Esposizione Generale of Turin. In 1885, he exhibited the work Le zappe abbandonate at the Promotrice. He tended to paint refined genre pieces.

He was influenced by Divisionism and the style of Telemaco Signorini. He studied and later taught at the Accademia Albertina. He painted with Anselmo Sacerdote, Giovanni Colmo, and Carlo Pollonera in the so-called School of Rivara.

Among his pupils was Mario Gachet.
