= Perlo, Piedmont =

Perlo
- Comune
- Comune di Perlo
- Location within Italy Location within Piedmont
- Coordinates: 44°20′N 8°5′E
- Country: Italy
- Region: Piedmont
- Province: Province of Cuneo (CN)

Area
  - Total: 11.6 km^{2} (4.5 sq mi)

Population (Dec. 2004)
  - Total: 121
  - Density: 10.4/km^{2} (27.0/sq mi)
- Time zone: UTC+1 (CET)
  - Summer (DST): UTC+2 (CEST)
- Postal code: 12070
- Dialing code: 0174

Perlo is a comune (municipality) in the Province of Cuneo in the Italian region Piedmont, located about 90 kilometres (56 mi) southeast of Turin and about 45 kilometres (28 mi) east of Cuneo. As of 31 December 2004, it had a population of 121 and an area of 11.6 square kilometres (4.5 mi^{2}).

Perlo borders the following municipalities: Bagnasco, Ceva, Massimino, Murialdo, Nucetto, and Priero.

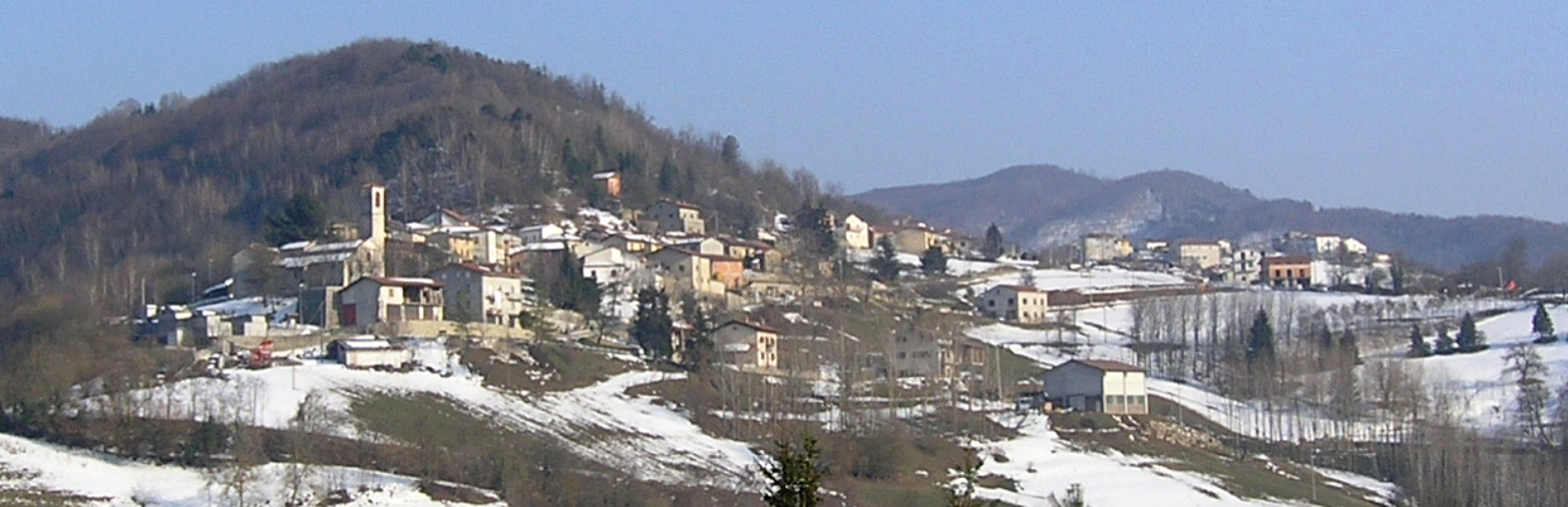
Landscape of Perlo

== Demographic evolution ==
Historical population

| Year | Pop. | ±% |
|---|---|---|
| 1861 | 528 | — |
| 1871 | 530 | +0.4% |
| 1881 | 556 | +4.9% |
| 1901 | 535 | −3.8% |
| 1911 | 550 | +2.8% |

| Year | Pop. | ±% |
|---|---|---|
| 1921 | 464 | −15.6% |
| 1931 | 425 | −8.4% |
| 1936 | 451 | +6.1% |
| 1951 | 411 | −8.9% |
| 1961 | 273 | −33.6% |

| Year | Pop. | ±% |
|---|---|---|
| 1971 | 247 | −9.5% |
| 1981 | 184 | −25.5% |
| 1991 | 164 | −10.9% |
| 2001 | 130 | −20.7% |

Source: Data from ISTAT
