= Calizzano =

- Comune
- Comune di Calizzano
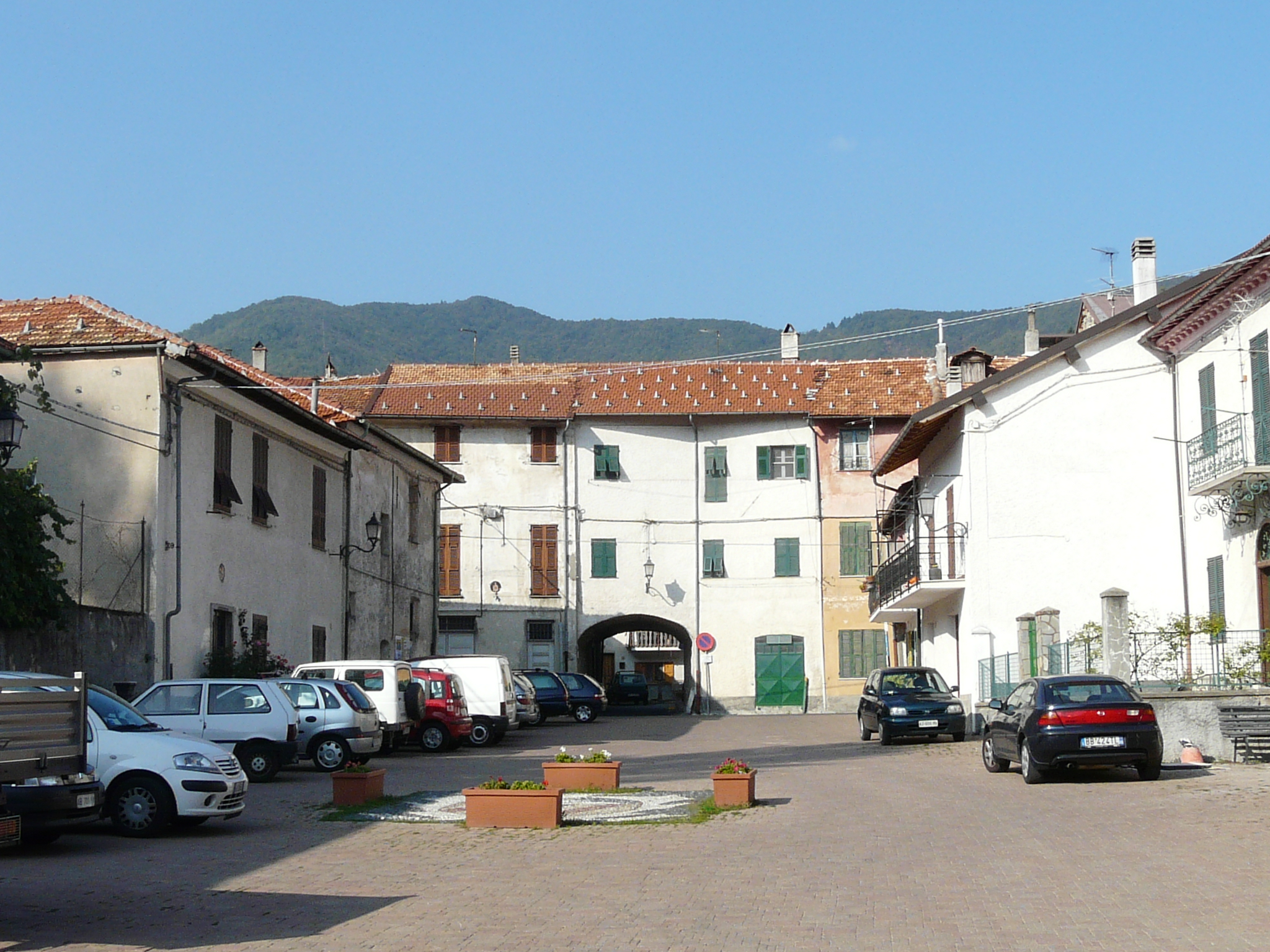
- View from the historic centre

- Coat of arms

- Location within Italy Location within Liguria
- Coordinates: 44°14′N 8°7′E
- Country: Italy
- Region: Liguria
- Province: Savona (SV)
- Frazioni: Mereta, Vetria, Caragna

Government
  - Mayor: Pierangelo Olivieri

Area
  - Total: 62.74 km^{2} (24.22 sq mi)
- Elevation: 647 m (2,123 ft)

Population (30 April 2017)
  - Total: 1,464
  - Density: 23.33/km^{2} (60.44/sq mi)
- Demonym: Calizzanesi
- Time zone: UTC+1 (CET)
  - Summer (DST): UTC+2 (CEST)
- Postal code: 17020
- Dialing code: 019
- Patron saint: Madonna delle Grazie
- Saint day: 2 July
- Website: Official website

Calizzano (Ligurian: Carizan or Calissan) is a comune (municipality) in the Province of Savona in the Italian region Liguria, located about 70 kilometres (43 mi) southwest of Genoa and about 30 kilometres (19 mi) west of Savona.

Calizzano borders the following municipalities: Bagnasco, Bardineto, Bormida, Garessio, Magliolo, Massimino, Murialdo, Osiglia, Priola, and Rialto. It is in the upper Bormida Valley.

== See also ==
- Monte Spinarda
