= Priola =

- Comune
- Comune di Priola
- Location within Italy Location within Piedmont
- Coordinates: 44°15′N 8°1′E
- Country: Italy
- Region: Piedmont
- Province: Cuneo (CN)
- Frazioni: Pievetta, Casario, Careffi, Pianchiosso

Government
  - Mayor: Luciano Sciandra

Area
  - Total: 27.37 km^{2} (10.57 sq mi)
- Elevation: 537 m (1,762 ft)

Population (31 December 2010)
  - Total: 765
  - Density: 28.0/km^{2} (72.4/sq mi)
- Demonym: Priolesi - pievettesi
- Time zone: UTC+1 (CET)
  - Summer (DST): UTC+2 (CEST)
- Postal code: 12070
- Dialing code: 0174
- Website: Official website

Priola is a comune (municipality) in the Province of Cuneo in the Italian region Piedmont, located about 90 kilometres (56 mi) southeast of Turin and about 40 kilometres (25 mi) southeast of Cuneo.

Priola borders the following municipalities: Bagnasco, Calizzano, Garessio, and Viola.

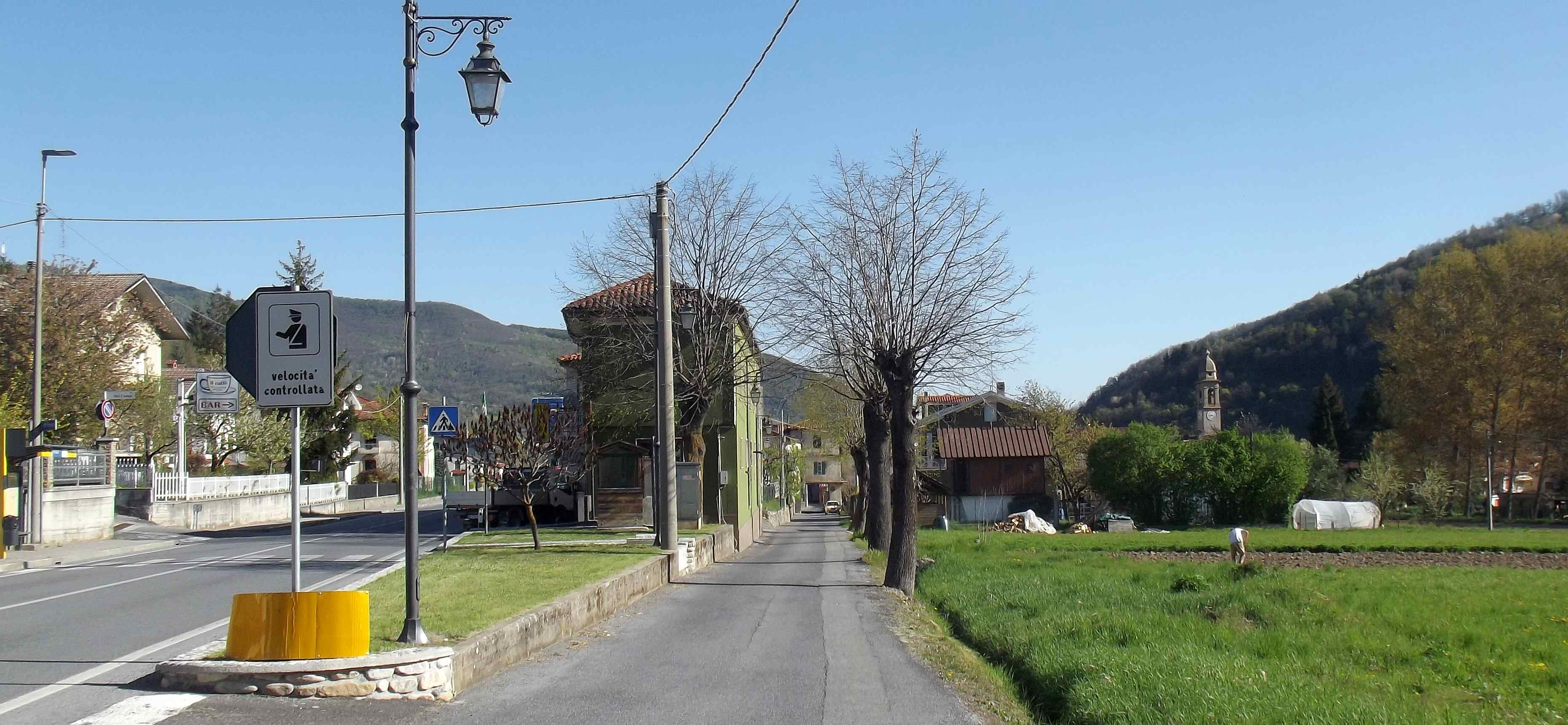
Priola (CN, Italy): panorama
