= Battifollo =

- Comune
- Comune di Battifollo

- Coat of arms

- Location within Italy Location within Piedmont
- Coordinates: 44°19′N 8°0′E
- Country: Italy
- Region: Piedmont
- Province: Cuneo (CN)

Government
  - Mayor: Giovanni Secondo Barberis

Area
  - Total: 11.12 km^{2} (4.29 sq mi)
- Elevation: 846 m (2,776 ft)

Population (30 April 2017)
  - Total: 252
  - Density: 22.7/km^{2} (58.7/sq mi)
- Demonym: Battifolesi
- Time zone: UTC+1 (CET)
  - Summer (DST): UTC+2 (CEST)
- Postal code: 12070
- Dialing code: 0174
- Website: Official website

Battifollo is a comune (municipality) in the Province of Cuneo in the Italian region Piedmont, located about 90 kilometres (56 mi) southeast of Turin and about 35 kilometres (22 mi) east of Cuneo.

Battifollo borders the following municipalities: Bagnasco, Ceva, Lisio, Nucetto, and Scagnello. Sights include remains of a castle, used by the French troops in 1796 as defensive position.
