= Colle San Bernardo =

Mountain pass in Italy

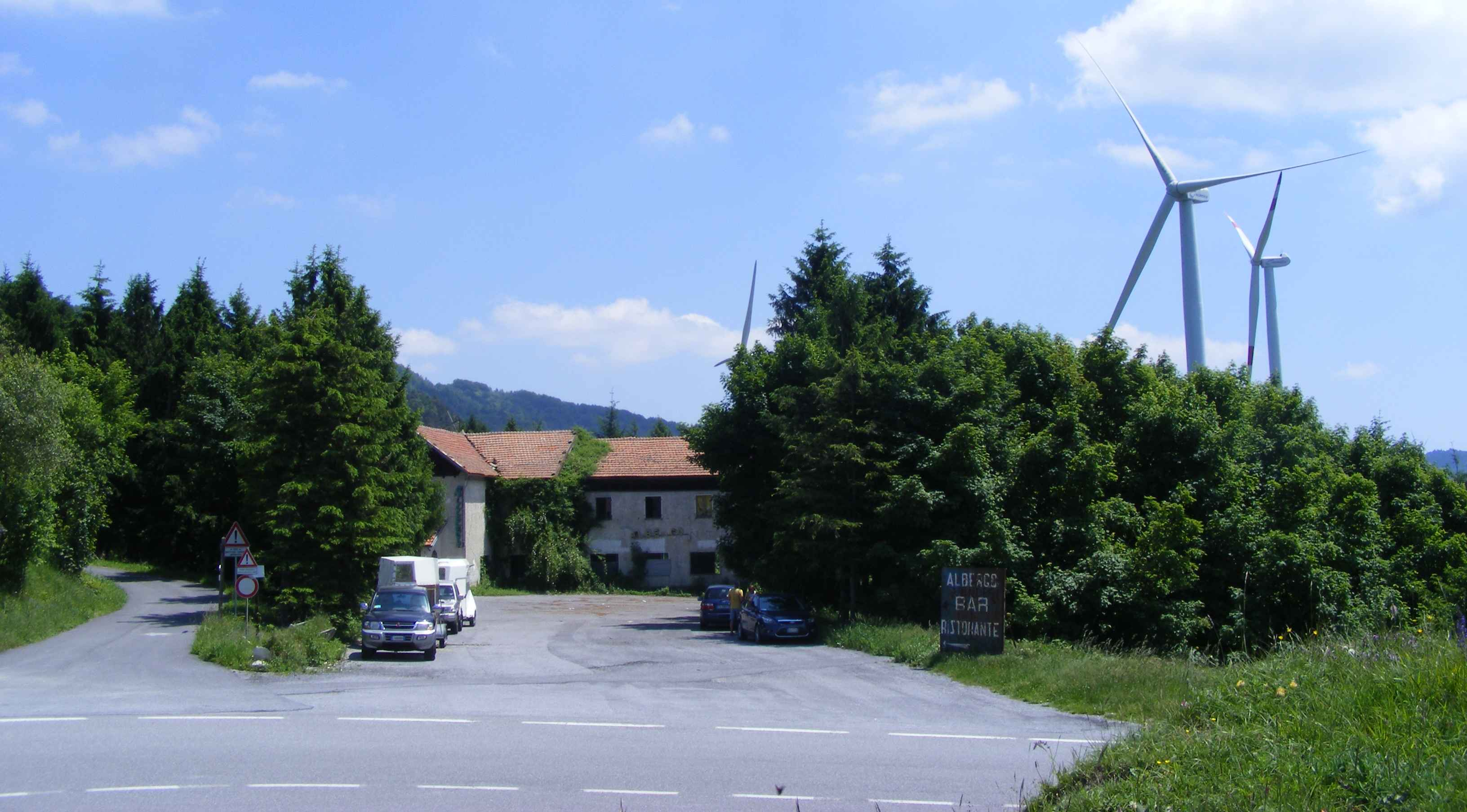

- Location within Alps
- Elevation: 957 metres (3,140 ft)
- Traversed by: National road 582 del Colle di San Bernardo

Third Approach
- Location: Piedmont, Italy
- Range: Ligurian Alps
- Coordinates: 44°10′37″N 8°02′49″E

Colle San Bernardo (957 m) is a mountain pass in the Province of Cuneo (Italy).

== Geography ==
The pass is located on the main chain of the Alps and connects Garessio with Erli and Albenga (Province of Savona), on the coast of Ligurian Sea. It's traversed by the National road nr. 582 del Colle di San Bernardo

Near the pass is located a small a small wind farm with a total capacity of 12.5 MW.

== Main road distances ==
- Albenga 27 km
- Erli 12 km
- Garessio 9 km

== Hiking and cycling ==
The pass is also accessible by off-road mountain paths and is crossed by the Alta Via dei Monti Liguri, a long-distance trail from Ventimiglia (province of Imperia) to Bolano (province of La Spezia). The cycling climb to Colle San Bernardo can be combined with Colle del Quazzo and Colle Scravaion thus making an interesting round-trip.

== See also ==
- List of mountain passes
- Monte Pietra Ardena
