= Colle del Quazzo =

Mountain pass in Italy

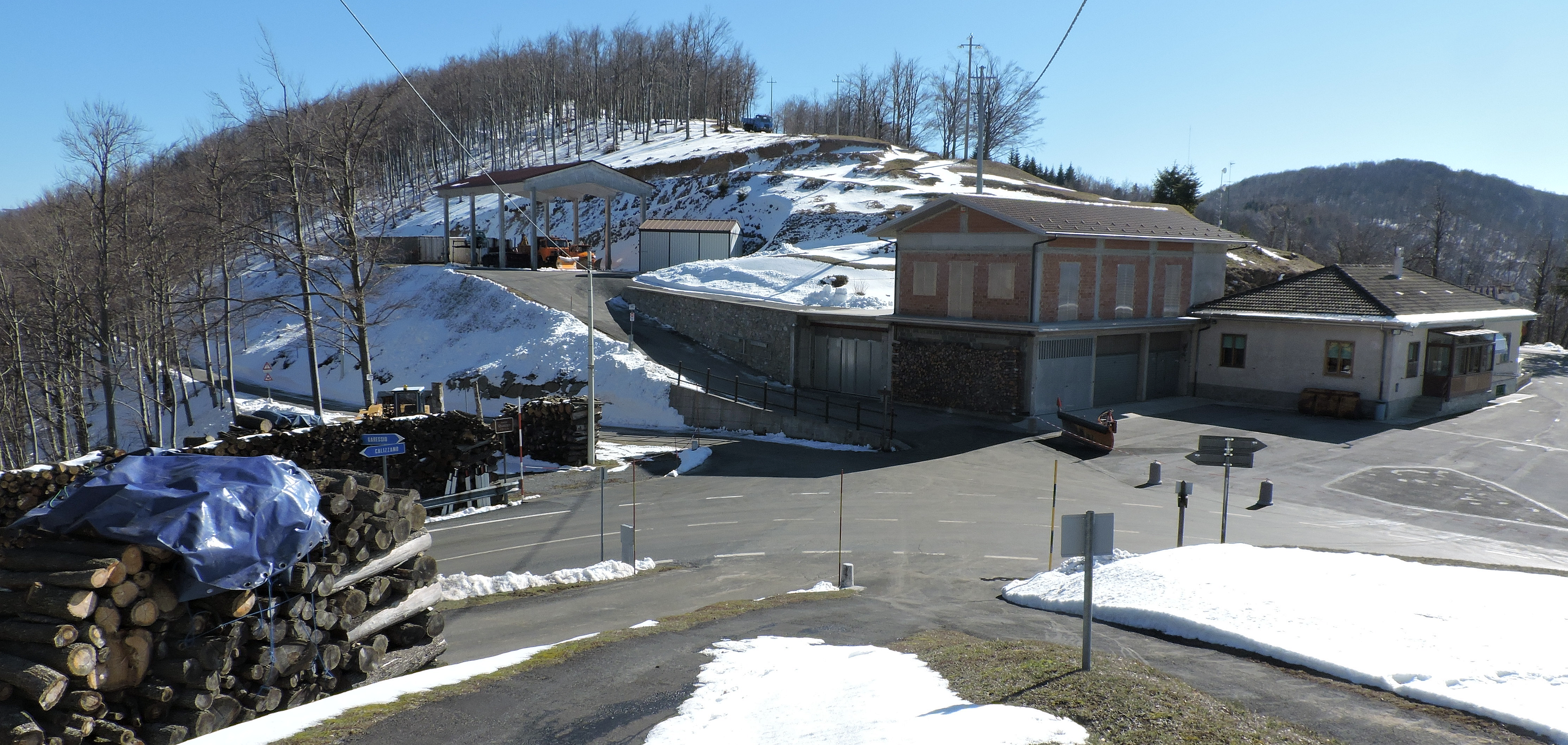
- The pass in winter

- Location within Alps
- Elevation: 1,090 m (3,580 ft)
- Traversed by: S.P. 213 (CN), S.P. 47 (SV)

Third Approach
- Location: Piedmont, Italy
- Range: Ligurian Alps
- Coordinates: 44°12′06″N 8°04′04″E

The Colle del Quazzo (1090 m) is a mountain pass in the Ligurian Alps (Italy). It connects Garessio (Piedmont) with Calizzano (Liguria).

== Geography ==
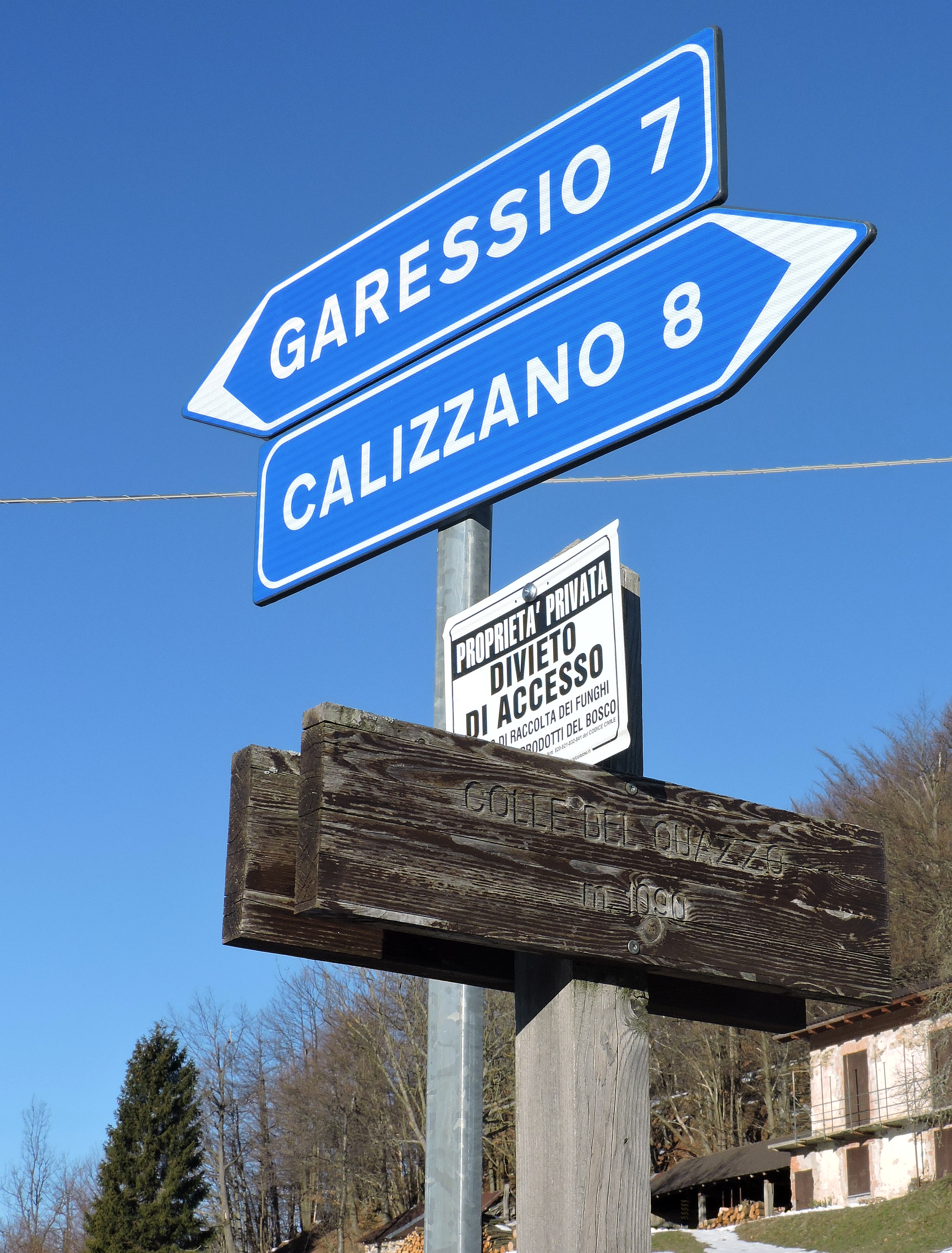
Road panel at the pass

The pass stands between Bric Meriano (NW, 1.251 m) and Bric verdiola (SE, 1.154 m). It belongs to the comune of Garessio and is located near its border with the ligurian comune of Calizzano. The pass connects the high part of Tanaro valley (North) with the valley of the Bormida.

== Road access ==
The pass can be reached from Garessio following the SP nr.213. On the other side of the pass the road goes down till to the Ligurian border, where it takes the name of SP nr. 47 Calizzano - Garessio and ends in Calizzano. Cyclists appreciate the climb because it crosses a pleasant woody area, car and truck traffic is very sparse and it offers some good views on the neighbouring mountains. The climb to Colle del Quazzo can be combined with Colle San Bernardo and Colle Scravaion thus making an interesting round-trip. Colle del Quazzo is also frequented by motorcycle riders.

== Hiking ==
From the Colle del Quazzo starts a pedestrian track leading to Monte Spinarda, a popular hike both by summer and winter, when in case of snow is suitable for snowshoes.
