= Garessio =

- Comune
- Città di Garessio
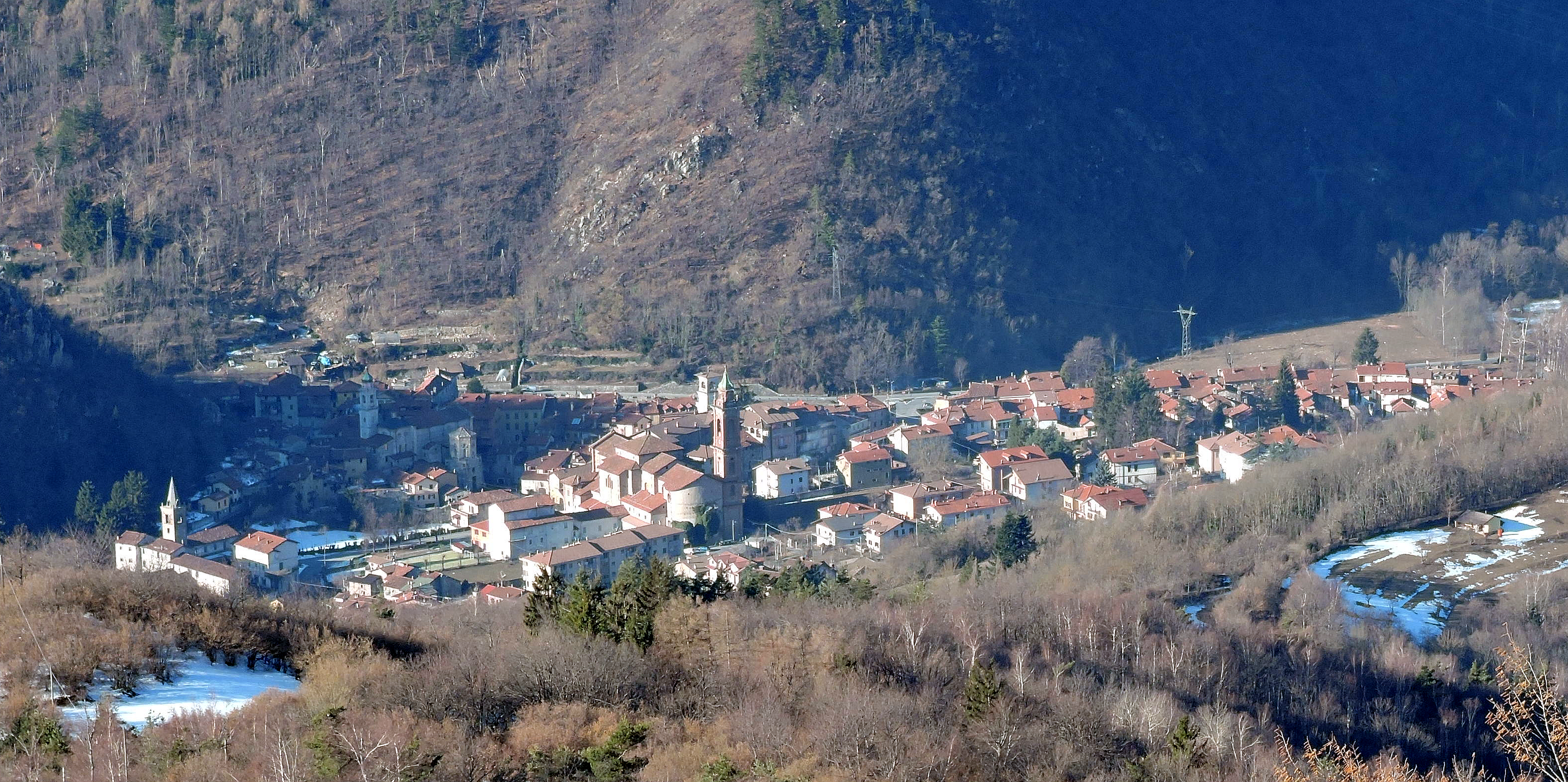

- Coat of arms

- Location within Italy Location within Piedmont
- Coordinates: 44°12′N 8°1′E
- Country: Italy
- Region: Piedmont
- Province: Cuneo (CN)
- Frazioni: Barchi, Cappello, Cerisola, Deversi, Mindino, Mursecco, Pianbernardo, Piangranone, Trappa, Valdinferno

Government
  - Mayor: Ferruccio Fazio

Area
  - Total: 131.01 km^{2} (50.58 sq mi)
- Elevation: 621 m (2,037 ft)

Population (31 December 2015)
  - Total: 3,244
  - Density: 24.76/km^{2} (64.13/sq mi)
- Demonym: Garessini
- Time zone: UTC+1 (CET)
  - Summer (DST): UTC+2 (CEST)
- Postal code: 12075
- Dialing code: 0174
- Website: Official website

Garessio is a comune (municipality) in the Province of Cuneo in the Italian region Piedmont, located about 100 kilometres (62 mi) south of Turin and about 40 kilometres (25 mi) southeast of Cuneo. It is one of I Borghi più belli d'Italia ("The most beautiful villages of Italy").

The former Savoy family palace, the Reggia di Val Casotto is located within the town limits. Garessio is located in the Ligurian Alps. Located on the border between Liguria and Piemonte provinces, the town's location affords easy access the Mediterranean Sea along with the UNESCO World Heritage Site the Langhe wine region which grows the famous Italian wines such as Barolo and Dolcetto.

Garessio is famous for the mineral water found in the town. The Aqua San Bernardo has been famous throughout Italy for as possessing healing properties. At the turn of the century, Garessio was a famous spa town attracting tourists to take the waters and spend the summer in the cool climate. The town has been reinventing itself as a sports center as It is well located for outdoor sports such as mountain biking, road cycling, skiing and hiking. The historical town center of Garessio has been well preserved as it has been overlooked for development by the local population and has attracted expatriate buyers interested in historical properties.

== History ==
Garessio was an important stopping point during the Medieval era for the salt trade. The salt was brought over the Ligurian Alps from the Mediterranean Sea along paths and re-packed and sold in Garessio for distribution to Northern Europe.

== People ==
- Giuseppe Penone (born 1947), artist
- Giorgetto Giugiaro (born 1938), automobile designer.
- Eugenio Colmo (1885 -1967) cartoonist

== See also ==
- Colle del Quazzo
- Monte Spinarda
- Monte Antoroto
- Monte Pietra Ardena
