= Monte Mongioie =

Mountain in Italy

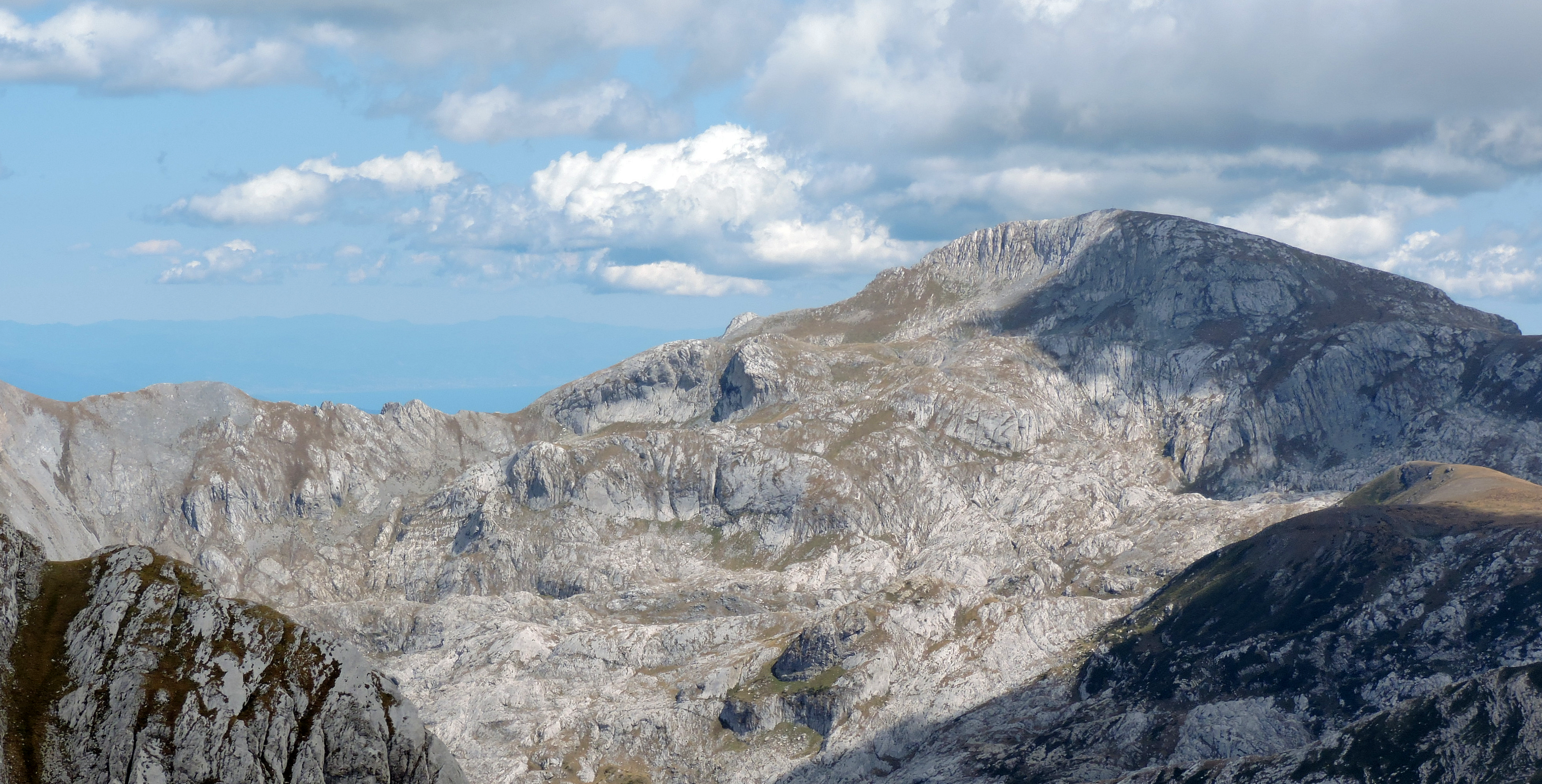
- View of the mountain from Pian Ballaur (West)

Highest point
- Elevation: 2,631 m (8,632 ft)
- Prominence: 476 m (1,562 ft)
- Isolation: 8.05 km (5.00 mi)
- Listing: Alpine mountains 2500-2999 m
- Coordinates: 44°10′27″N 7°47′07″E

Geography
- Location within Alps
- Location: Piemonte, Italy
- Parent range: Ligurian Alps

Geology
- Rock type(s): limestone, dolomite and schists.

Climbing
- Easiest route: waymarked hiking route

The Monte Mongioie is a mountain of the Ligurian Alps located in Piedmont (NW Italy).

== Toponymy ==
The mountain was once known also as Cima Rascaira, and appears with this name in the official map of the Kingdom of Sardinia (1720–1861) printed in 1852. It is also referenced as Raschera, which is the name of a lake, of alpine pasture at the foot of the mountain and of the typical cheese of the area. Due to its isolation the summit offers a very good view on a wide stretch of the Western Alps.

== Geography ==
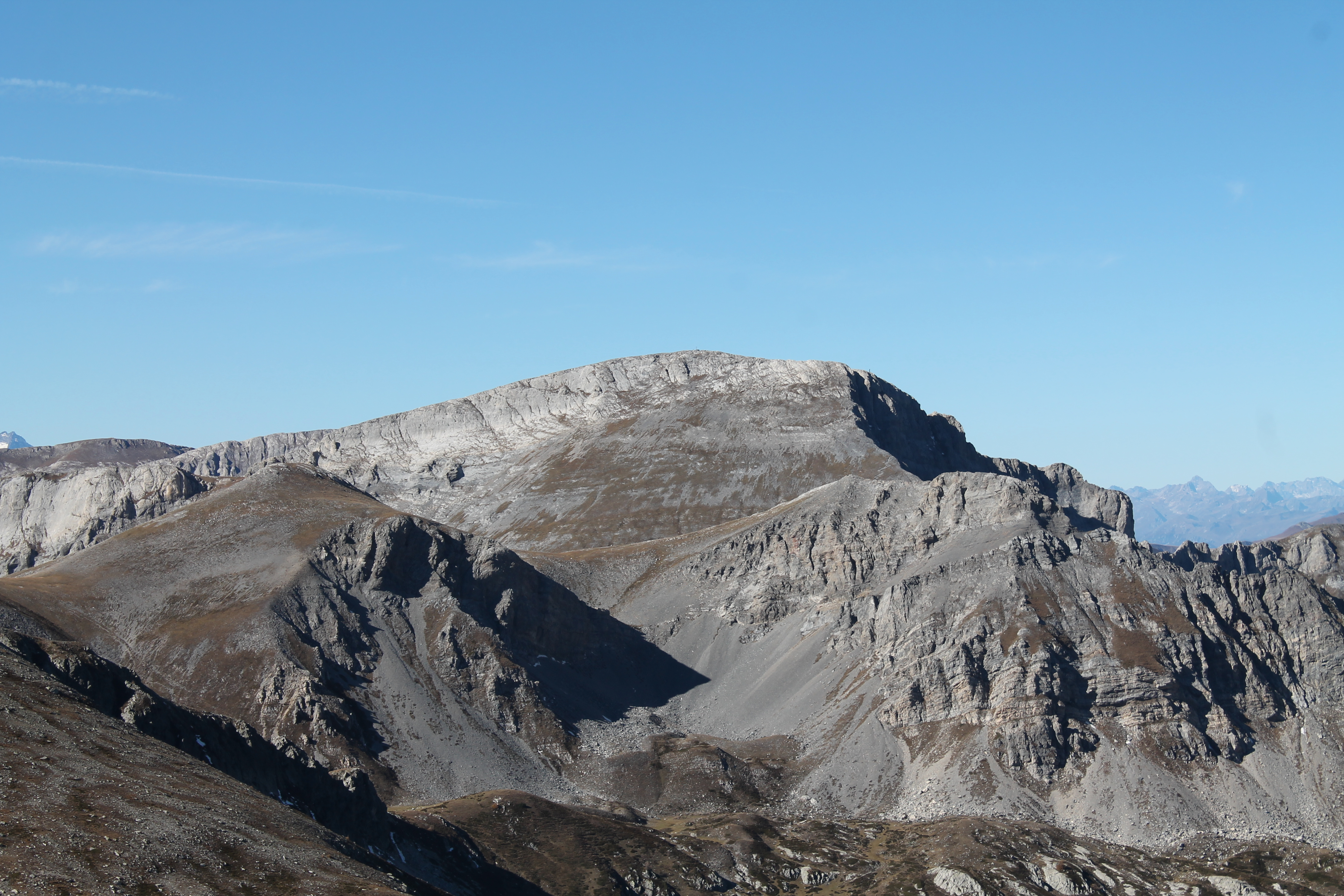
View of the mountain from the Pizzo d'Ormea (East)

The mountain is the tripoint where the valleys of Tanaro (south), Ellero (NW) and Corsaglia (NE) meet. Westwards the north water divide of Tanaro Valley continues heading to the Cima delle Saline, while eastwards it connects Monte Mongioie with Monte Rotondo and Pizzo d'Ormea through a pass named Bocchino dell’Aseo (2,295 m). The Corsaglia/Ellero ridge branching out from Monte Mongioie heads North towards the Po Plain.

=== SOIUSA classification ===
According to the SOIUSA (International Standardized Mountain Subdivision of the Alps) the mountain can be classified in the following way:

- main part = Western Alps
- major sector = South Western Alps
- section = Ligurian Alps
- subsection = It:Alpi del Marguareis/Fr:Alpes Liguriennes Occidentales
- supergroup = It:Catena Marguareis-Mongioie/Fr:Chaîne Marguareis-Mongioie
- group =It:Gruppo Mongioie-Mondolè
- subgroup = It:nodo del Mongioie
- code = I/A-1.II-B.4.a

== Geology ==
Monte Mongioie summit and western slopes are made of tabular, marmoreal limestone, dating back to Jurassic; on its eastern part also emerge Triassic layers of dolomitic limestone, located in a belt oriented from North to South passing through the Bocchino dell'Aseo. On the sub-vertical cliffs near the summit and on the SW ridge of MOnte Mongioie can be noticed blackish schistose limestones, fine-grained grey dolomite and red and yellow schists.

== Access to the summit ==
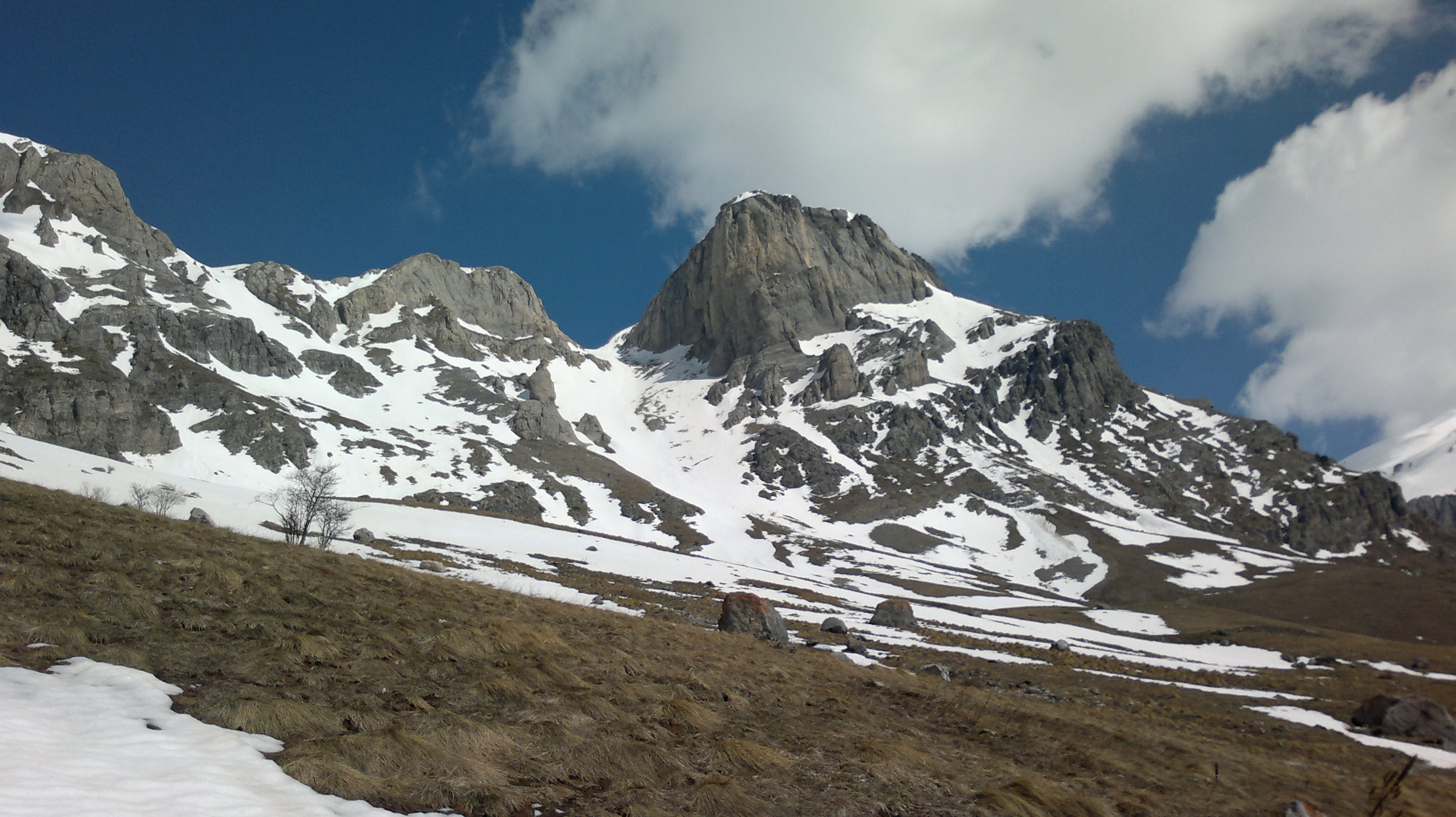
Monte Mongioie as seen from Tanaro valley, on the left the ‘’Canale delle Scaglie’’

=== Summer ===
The normal route to the Mongioie requires some hiking experience but not alpinistic skills. The summit can be accessed by a waymarked itinerary from Viozene (in the comune of Ormea) passing through a mountain hut named Rifugio Mongioie (1.555 m), and then following by a large footpath up to Pian dell'Olio. From there a gully called Canale delle Scaglie leads to the Bocchino dell'Aseo, a mountain pass on the Tanaro-Corsaglia water divide. The last part of the ascent runs up the western ridge of the mountain.

=== Winter ===
The mountain is also accessible in winter by ski mountaineers from Viozene or Artesina.

== Mountain huts ==
- Rifugio Mongioie (Tanaro valley),
- Rifugio Havis De Giorgio (Ellero valley),
- Cavallero bivuac (Corsaglia valley).

== Maps ==
- Cartografia ufficiale italiana in scala 1:25.000 e 1:100.000 (Map). Istituto Geografico Militare.
- Carta in scala 1:50.000 n. 8 Alpi Marittime e Liguri (Map). Torino: Istituto Geografico Centrale.
- Carta dei sentieri e stradale scala 1:25.000 n. 22 Mondovì Val Ellero Val Maudagna Val Corsaglia Val Casotto (Map). Ciriè: Fraternali editore.

== See also ==
- Lake Raschera
- Pizzo d'Ormea
