= Lake Raschera =

Alpine lake in Piedmont, Italy

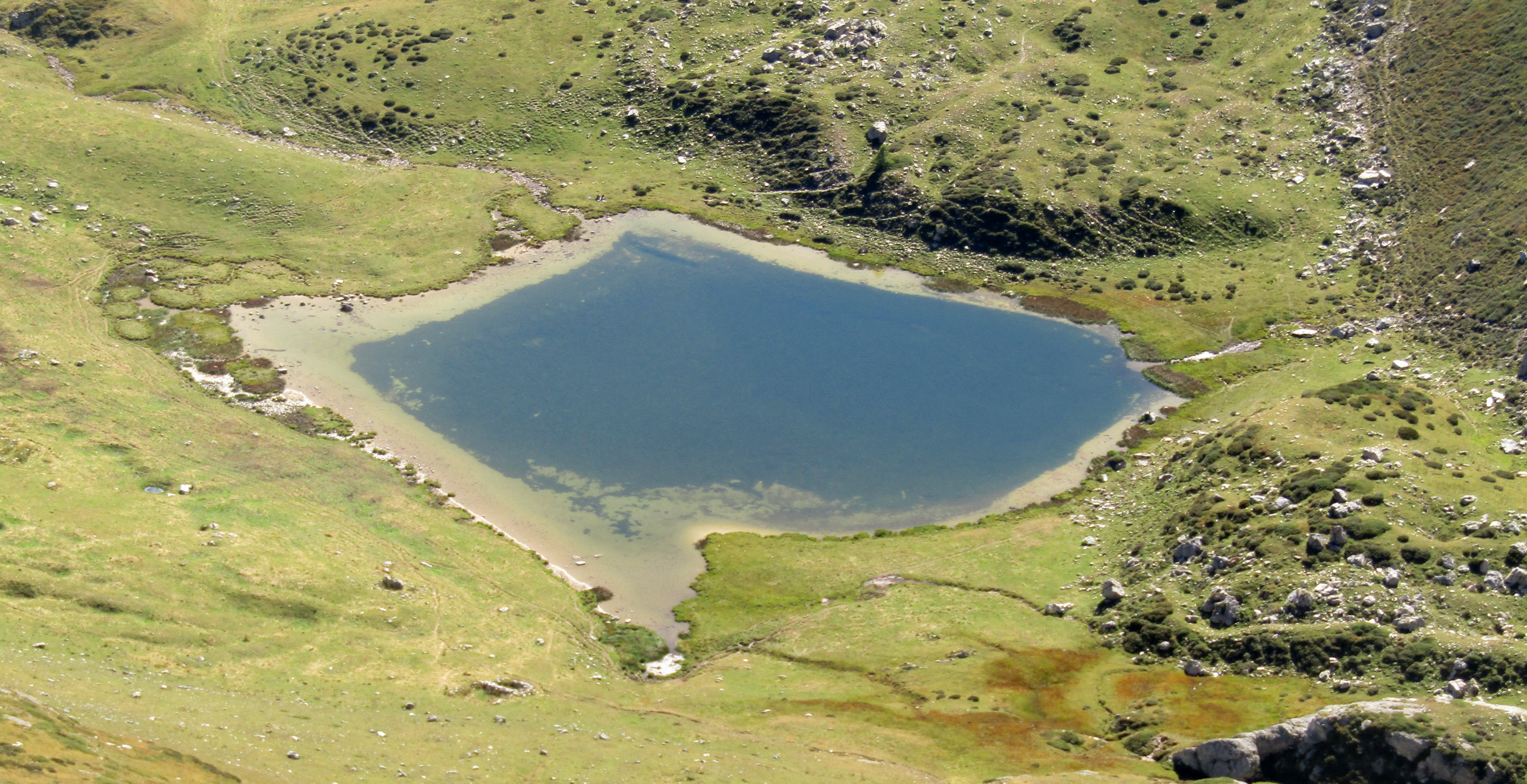
- The lake from Cima della Brignola
- Interactive map of Lake Raschera
- Location: Magliano Alpi, Province of Cuneo, Piedmont, Italy
- Coordinates: 44.18311°N 7.78818°E
- Basin countries: Italy
- Surface elevation: 2,108 m (6,916 ft)
- Islands: None

The Lake Raschera is an alpine lake located at 2,108 m a.s.l. in the Ligurian Alps, in an administrative enclave of the municipality of Magliano Alpi. It is situated in the upper valley of the Corsaglia.

== History ==
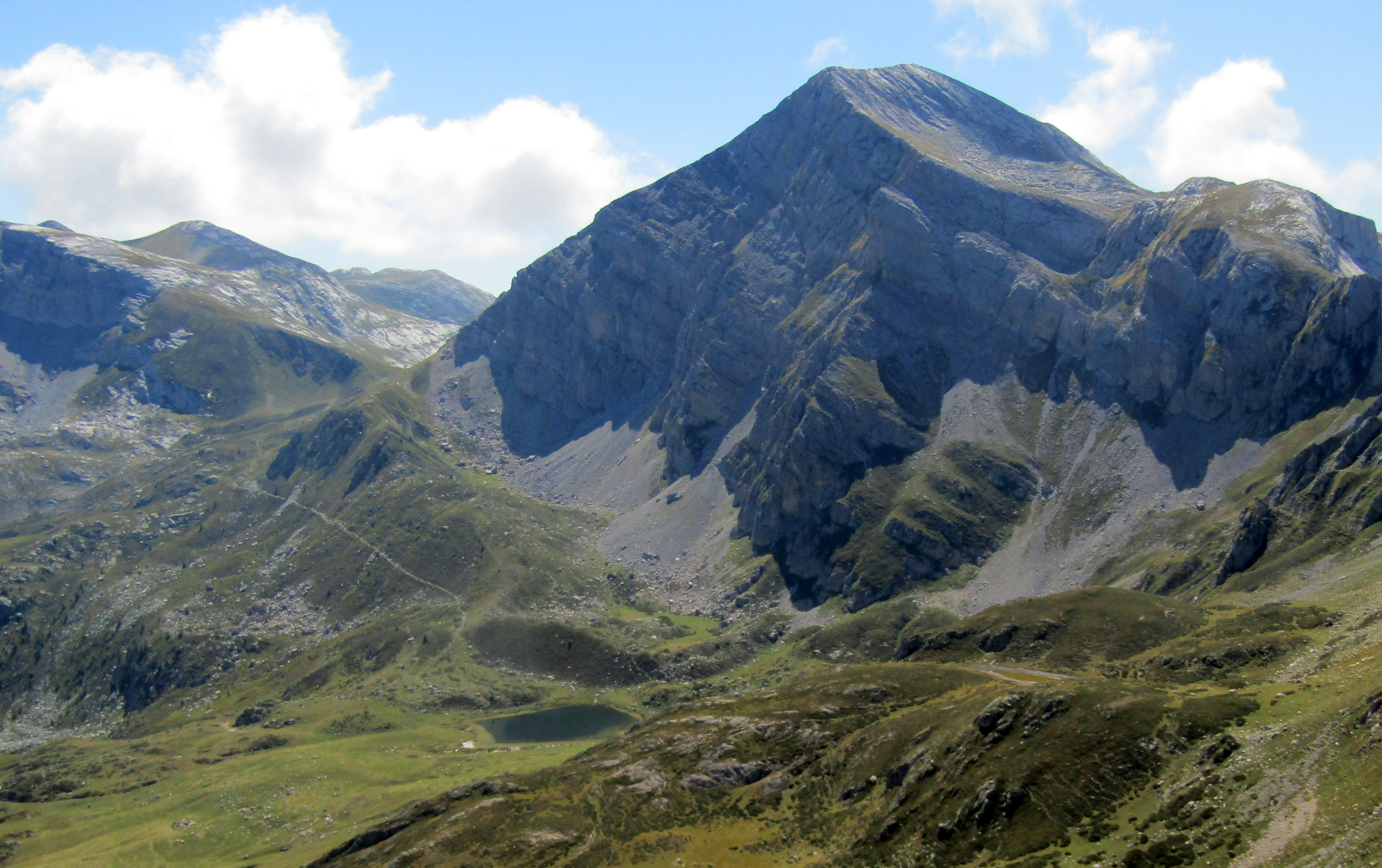
The lake's basin with the Mongioie

The area where the lake is located has been known for centuries for the quality of its pastures and the exceptional quality of the cheeses produced. The lake gives its name to the eponymous DOP cheese.

== Physical Geography ==
The lake is situated in a basin surrounded by various mountains, including the Cima Ferlette, the Cima della Brignola, and the Monte Mongioie. From the water surface originates the Raschera stream, whose waters, via the Sbornina stream, eventually feed the Corsaglia.

== Hiking ==
The lake can be reached on foot from the Rifugio Balma. A long agro-pastoral dirt track reaches the vicinity of the lake starting from the Corsaglia Valley floor. A trail that crosses the Bocchino della Brignola connects Lake Raschera with Lake Brignola.

== Bibliography ==
- Cartografia ufficiale italiana [Official Italian Cartography] (in Italian). Istituto Geografico Militare.
- "Val Vermenagna, Valle Pesio, Alta Valle Ellero". Carta dei sentieri e stradale [Map of Trails and Roads] (in Italian). Ciriè: Fraternali editore.
- "Alpi Marittime e Liguri" [Maritime and Ligurian Alps]. Carta [Map] (in Italian). Turin: Istituto Geografico Centrale.
