= Bric di Conoia =

Mountain in Italy

- Bric Conolia, Bric Conoja, Piz d'Cunùi
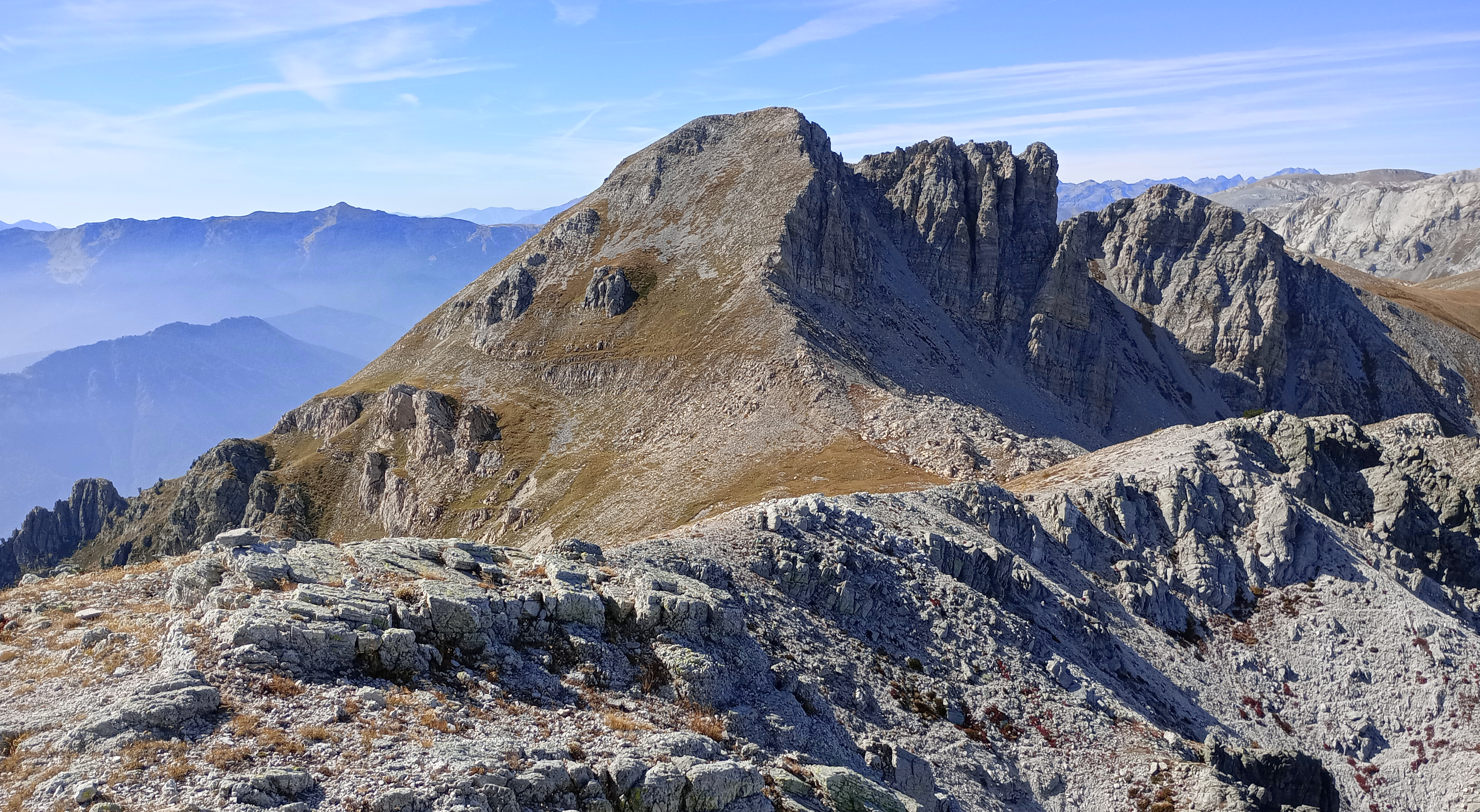
- Bric di Conoia as seen from Cima delle Roccate

Highest point
- Elevation: 2,521 m (8,271 ft)
- Prominence: 228 m (748 ft)
- Coordinates: 44°05′53″N 8°03′09″E

Geography
- Location within Alps
- Location: Piedmont, Italy
- Parent range: Ligurian Alps

Climbing
- First ascent: ancestral
- Easiest route: footpath from Viozene (Ormea)

The Bric di Conoia (2.521 m) is a mountain of the "Alpi del Marguareis", the western section of the Ligurian Alps.

== Etymology ==
The mountain was known in the past as Pizzo di Cornia or Pizzo Conolia, with the second toponym presumably derived from the first one. In the local dialect its name is Piz d'Cunùi.

== Features ==
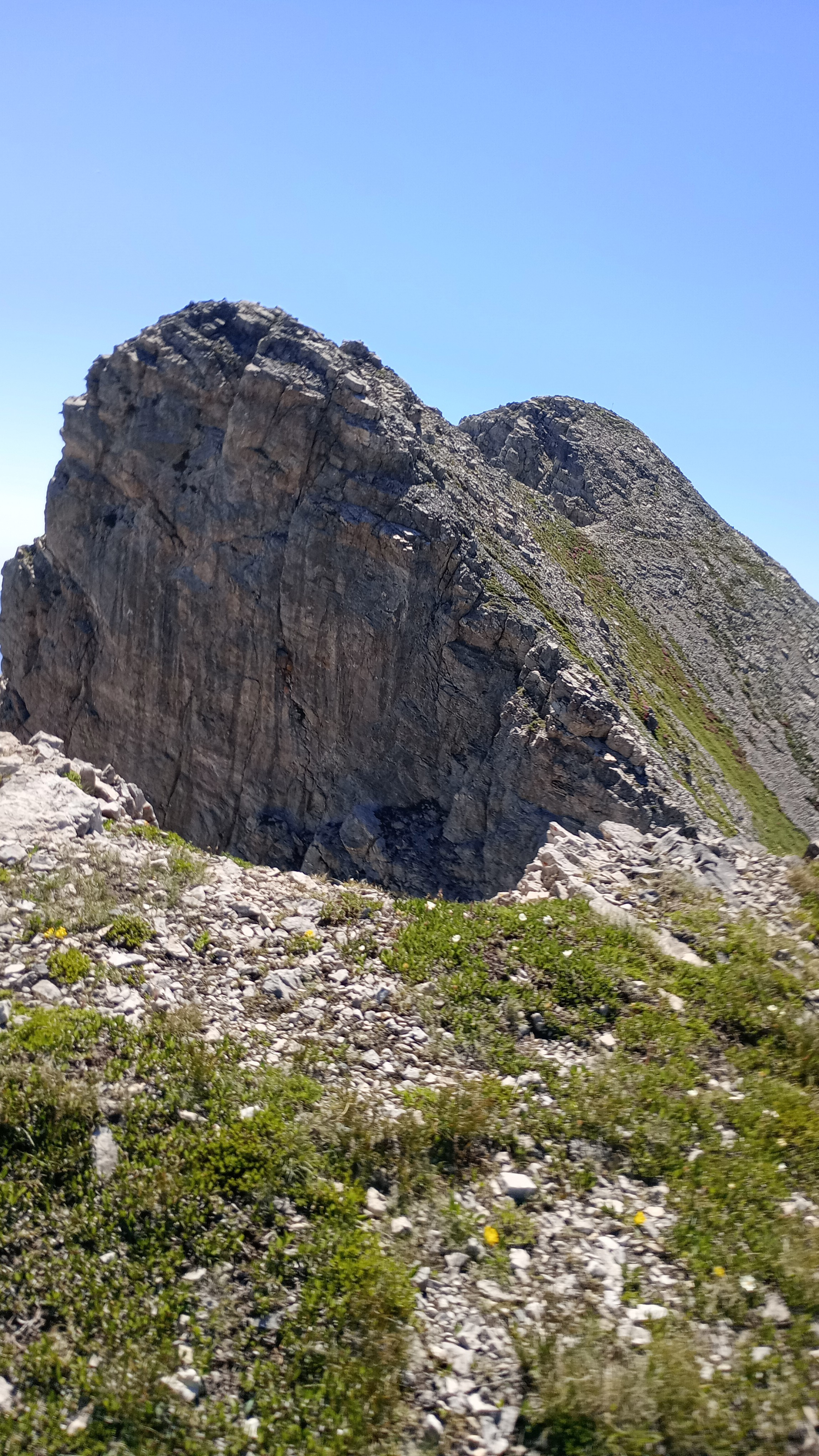
NW view

The Bric Conoia is located on the water divide between the Corsaglia valley (North) and the Tanaro valley (South). Eastwards, the Bocchin del Bianco pass (2.292 m) separates it from the Cima delle Roccate (2.380 m), while westwards the water divide loses height till to a saddle unnamed on the official chart. and flanked by a huge ponor named Il Profondo. The main ridge continues with the Monte Rotondo, Bocchin dell'Aseo pass and Monte Mongioie. Just North of the Bric Conoia stands the tiny Raschera lake, from which originates one of the headwaters of the Corsaglia creek. The high point of the mountain is flanked by some sub-summits; its sides are steady steep towards Tanaro Valley, while the North face has vertical rock walls. The summit is marked by a metallic summit cross. The prominence of Bric Conoia is of 228 m. Administratively it belongs to the region of Piedmont and the comune of Ormea. From its summit can be seen a wide panorama on the surrounding mountains and, in the distance, the Ligurian Sea.

=== SOIUSA classification ===
According to the SOIUSA (International Standardized Mountain Subdivision of the Alps) the mountain can be classified in the following way:

- main part = Western Alps; major sector = South Western Alps, section = Ligurian Alps, subsection = Alpi del Marguareis
- supergroup = Catena Marguareis-Mongioie, group = Gruppo Pizzo d'Ormea-Monte Antoroto, subgroup = Bric di Conolia-Pizzo d'Ormea, code = I/A-1.II-B.5.a.

== Geology ==
Bric di Conoia is mainly made of crystalline rocks and belongs to a series of Mesozoic origin. Tectonically they represent the easternmost strip of a syncline of the stratigraphyc complex which that constitutes the nearby Monte Mongioie.

== Access to the summit ==
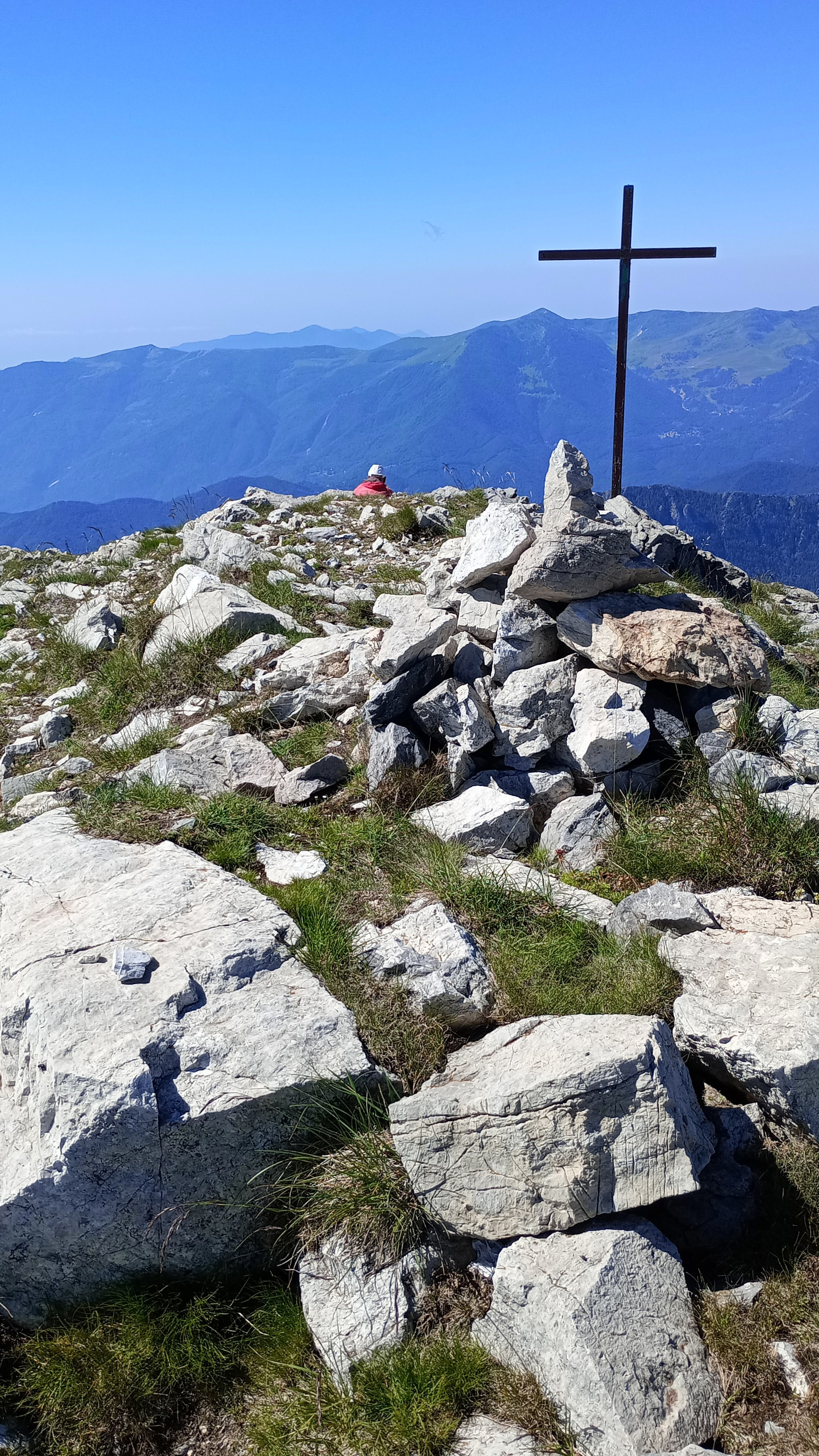
Summit cross

=== Summer ===
The summit can be reached following the main ridge both by the Bocchin del Bianco and Bocchin dell'Aseo. These are hiking itineraries waymarked with old paint signs and small cairns, suited for well-trained hikers. In summer, also with good weather, haze is quite common, but wonderful blooms can be admired.

=== Winter ===
The Bric di Conoia is the destination of some ski mountaineering routes, starting from different locations; the difficulty of the route through the NW face of the mountain is rated as PD (slightly difficult).

== Mountain huts ==
- Bivacco Franco Cavarero, Corsaglia valley
- Mongioie, High Tanaro valley
- Rifugio Valcaira, Tanaro valley

== See also ==
- Lake Revelli
- Pizzo d'Ormea

== Bibliography ==
- Marazzi, Sergio (2005). Atlante Orografico delle Alpi. SOIUSA (in Italian). Pavone Canavese: Priuli & Verlucca editori. ISBN 9788880682738.
- Montagna, Euro; Montaldo, Lorenzo (1981). Alpi Liguri. Guida dei Monti d'Italia (in Italian). Milano: CAI / TCI.

== Maps ==
- Cartografia ufficiale italiana in scala 1:25.000 e 1:100.000 (Map). Istituto Geografico Militare.
- Carta dei sentieri e stradale scala 1:25.000 n. 16 Val Vermenagna, Valle Pesio, Alta Valle Ellero (Map). Ciriè: Fraternali editore.
- Carta in scala 1:50.000 n. 8 Alpi Marittime e Liguri (Map). Torino: Istituto Geografico Centrale.

== Panorama ==
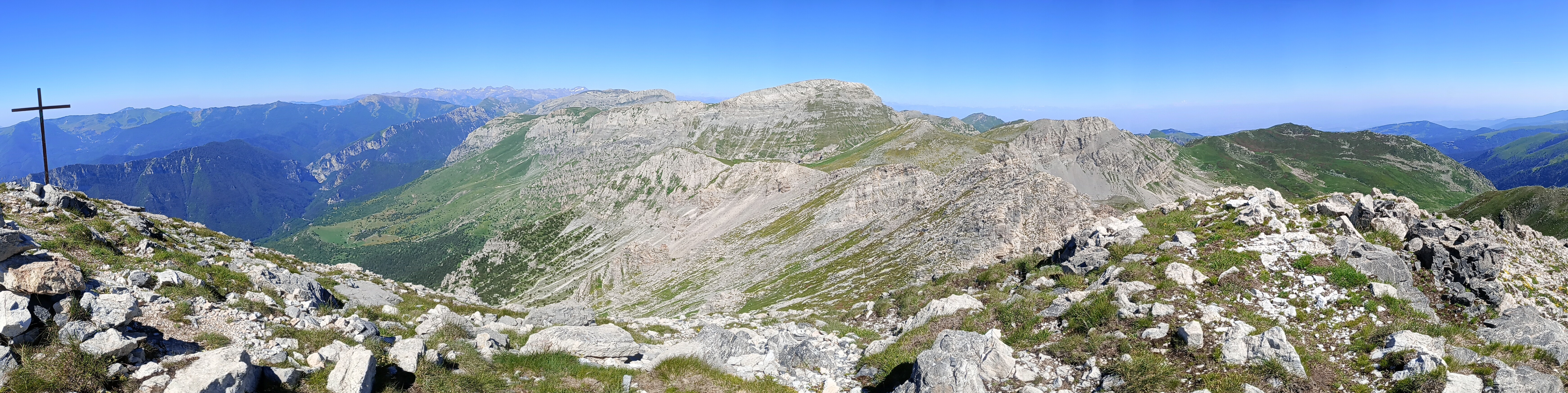
Nw view, with the Mongioie in the centre

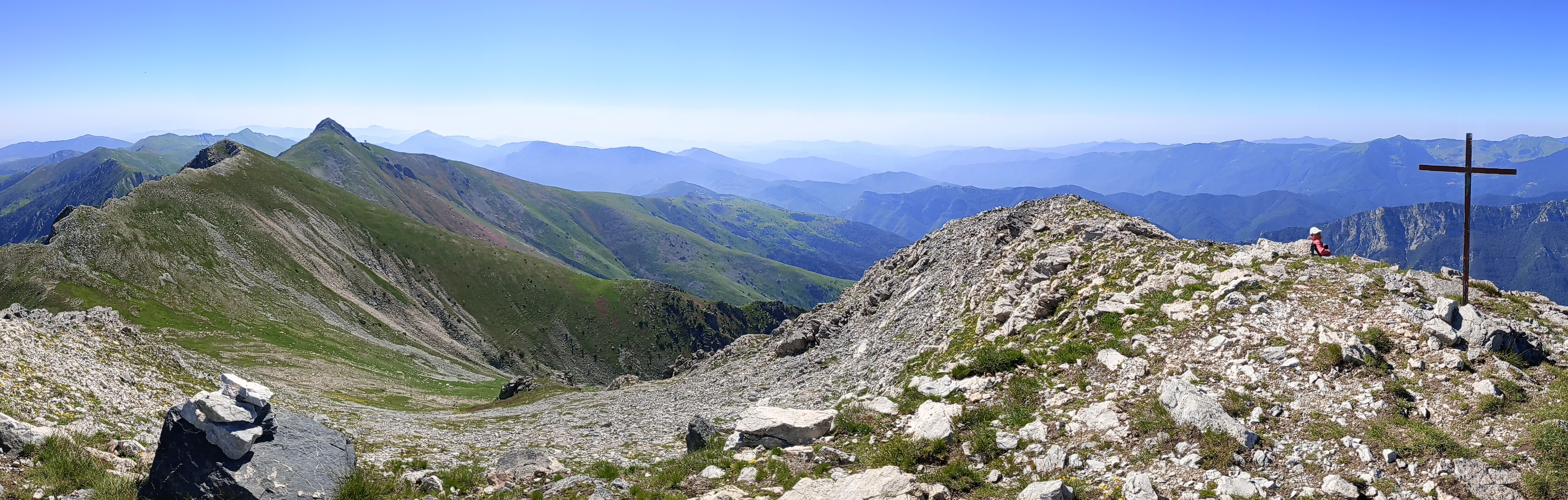
SE view, with the Pizzo d'Ormea
