= Pizzo d'Ormea =

Mountain in the Ligurian Alps, Italy

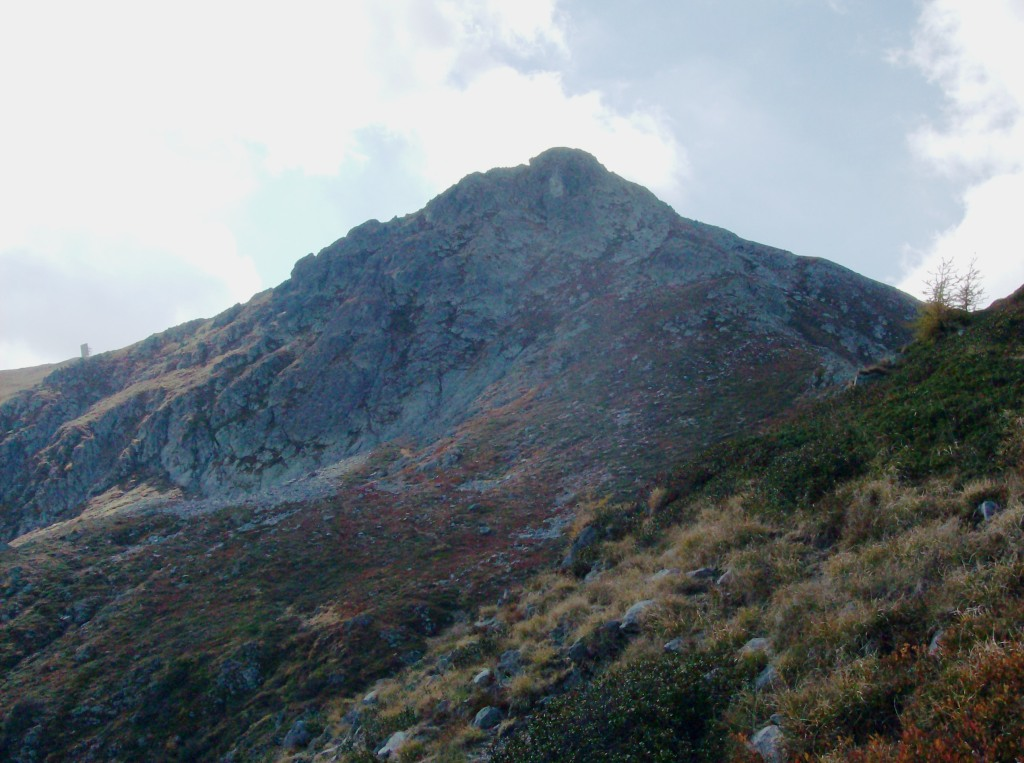
- Northern slope

Highest point
- Prominence: 172
- Coordinates: 44.165806°N 7.829806°E

Geography
- Country: Italy
- Region: Piedmont
- Parent range: Alps

The Pizzo d'Ormea is a mountain of the Ligurian Alps with an elevation of 2,476 m (8,123 ft). The summit is located in the municipality of Ormea, the city from which it takes its name.

== Characteristics ==
The mountain, which has a characteristic conical shape, is situated on a ridge that, starting near Ormea in Alta Val Tanaro, extends westward to the summit; this ridge, known as Costa Valcaira, separates the secondary Val d’Armella to the north from the open Valle del Chiappino to the south. From the summit, the ridge continues in the same direction toward the Cima delle Roccate, the Bric di Conoia, and Mongioie.

The southern slope consists of grassy slopes that reach the Pian degli Archetti, while the northern slope features steeper walls and rocky outcrops descending along a secondary ridge toward the underlying Passo della Colla del Pizzo, from where the secondary ridge continues northeast to Cima Ferrarine, where it bifurcates: one branch continues toward Cima Verzera and the Val Corsaglia, while another turns east toward the Colla dei Termini.

Below the Colla del Pizzo lies the alpine lake Lago del Pizzo d’Ormea, snow-covered for much of the year, from which the Armella torrent originates, flowing through the hamlet of Valdarmella to Ormea, where it joins the Tanaro.

From a geological perspective, the mountain is composed of porphyritic quartz rocks from the Permian, with highly varied internal typology.

The name derives from the city of Ormea, located at the mouth of Val d’Armella, within whose municipality the mountain lies. In the SOIUSA, Pizzo d’Ormea gives its name to the alpine subgroup Costiera Bric di Conolia - Pizzo d’Ormea.

At its summit, there is a metal cross and a brass disc indicating the directions and distances to the main peaks of the Alps and Apennines, as well as the main cities visible from the summit (Turin, Genoa, and the Po Valley in general). The panorama is 360 degrees, starting from the Apuan Alps, to the Ligurian coast, the Apennines, Corsica, the Ligurian Alps, the entire Alpine range up to Monte Rosa, and on the clearest days, to Pizzo Bernina. The topographic prominence of the mountain is 172 meters.

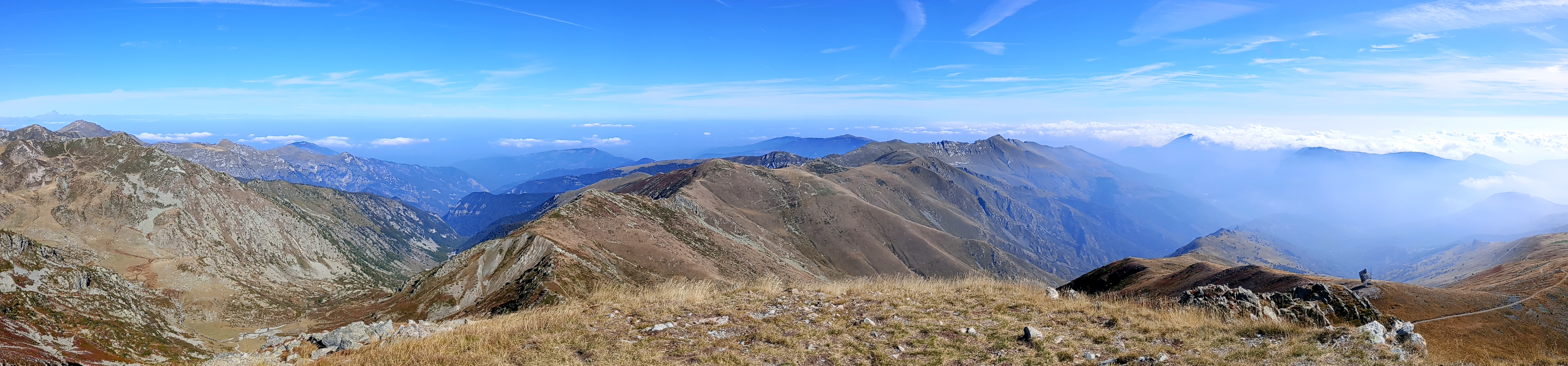
Eastward view, with Monte Antoroto

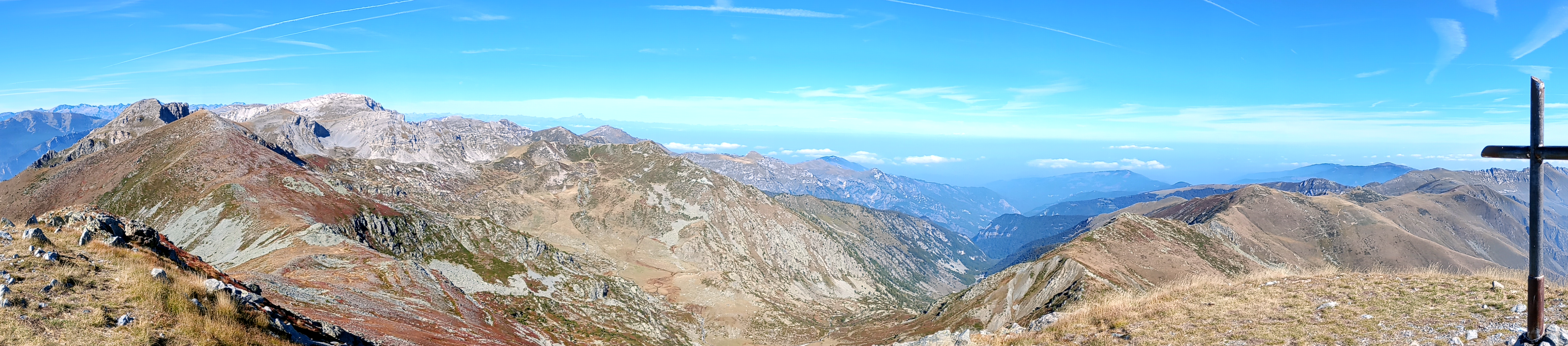
Westward view, with Cima delle Roccate and Mongioie

== Ascent to the summit ==
=== Summer access ===
The access routes to the summit are of a hiking type.

The normal route follows the eastern ridge via the Rocche dei Butti and the Costa Valcaira, starting from the hamlet of Chionea (in the municipality of Ormea). From here, a trail ascends along the ridge until it reaches the Rifugio Valcaira. The trail continues, reaching a telephone repeater; here, the route becomes slightly more challenging, and the summit is reached via rocky outcrops and easy climbing sections, though never exposed. The difficulty of the route is rated as E-EE.

The least demanding route starts from the hamlet of Quarzina, accessible by car on a very scenic paved road, and follows the southern ridge. From Quarzina, follow the signs for Rifugio Valcaira, proceeding on dirt tracks. After passing the Piano della Colma, the Castello di Quarzina, and the Pian degli Archetti, continue along the ridge, avoiding the rightward branch toward the Rifugio Valcaira. The telephone repeater is reached, and then the summit. The ascent to Pizzo d’Ormea can be combined with that of the nearby Cima delle Roccate.

An alternative route involves reaching the mountain from the Colla dei Termini, accessible by car from Ormea on a dirt road. A trail follows the ridge to the Colla del Pizzo; from there, a faint trail leads to the Colle delle Rocchette, and via the western ridge, the summit is reached.

The Colla del Pizzo can also be reached from the Val Corsaglia, passing through Bossea. In this case, the Bivacco Cavarero, located at Sella Revelli, can be used as a base.

=== Winter access ===
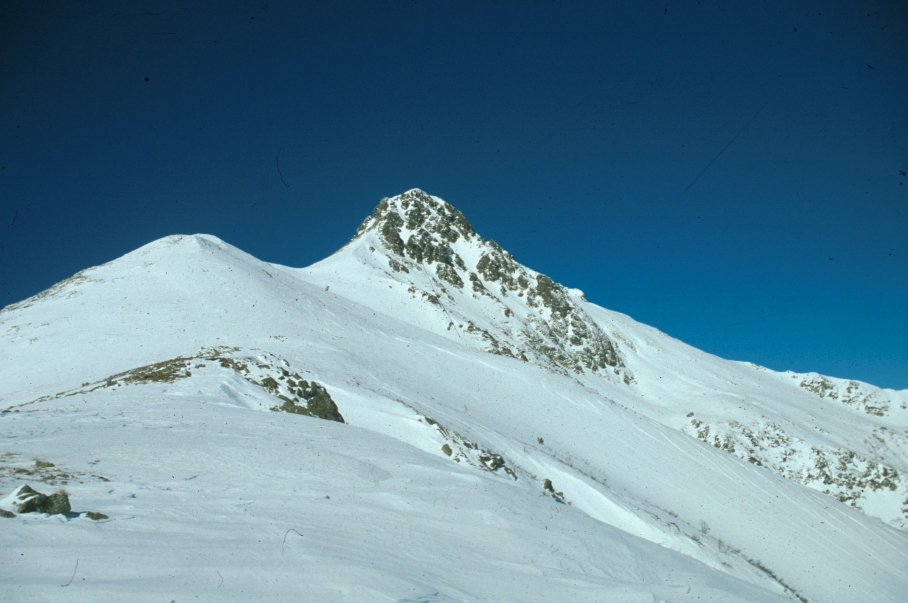
In winter

The summit is accessible in winter with snowshoes, or with skis following various routes. It is also possible to reach the summit via the northeast gully, an alpine route on snow and mixed terrain with a difficulty of PD+.

== Refuges and bivouacs ==
- Rifugio Valcaira
- Bivacco Cavarero
- Rifugio Quarzina
- Rifugio Chionea

== Webcam ==
At an elevation of 2,400 m on the southern slope, a webcam has been installed by the Imperia section of the European Radioamateurs Association.

== Bibliography ==
- Montagna, Euro; Montaldo, Lorenzo (1981). Alpi Liguri [Ligurian Alps]. Guida dei Monti d'Italia (in Italian). CAI-TCI.
- Parodi, Andrea (2005). Nelle Alpi del sole [In the Alps of the Sun] (in Italian). Genoa: Parodi Editore. ISBN 8888873066.

=== Cartography ===
- Cartografia ufficiale italiana in scala 1:25.000 e 1:100.000 [Official Italian cartography at scales 1:25,000 and 1:100,000] (in Italian). Istituto Geografico Militare.
- Carta dei sentieri e stradale scala 1:25.000 n. 22 Mondovì Val Ellero Val Maudagna Val Corsaglia Val Casotto [Trail and road map scale 1:25,000 no. 22 Mondovì Val Ellero Val Maudagna Val Corsaglia Val Casotto] (in Italian). Ciriè: Fraternali editore.
- Carta in scala 1:50.000 n. 8 Alpi Marittime e Liguri [Map scale 1:50,000 no. 8 Maritime and Ligurian Alps] (in Italian). Turin: Istituto Geografico Centrale.
