= Magliano Alpi =

Magliano Alpi Majan
- Comune
- Comune di Magliano Alpi
- Location within Italy Location within Piedmont
- Coordinates: 44°27′N 7°48′E
- Country: Italy
- Region: Piedmont
- Province: Province of Cuneo (CN)

Area
  - Total: 32.6 km^{2} (12.6 sq mi)

Population (Dec. 2004)
  - Total: 2,145
  - Density: 65.8/km^{2} (170/sq mi)
- Time zone: UTC+1 (CET)
  - Summer (DST): UTC+2 (CEST)
- Postal code: 12060
- Dialing code: 0174
- Patron saint: Our Lady of Mount Carmel
- Saint day: 16 July

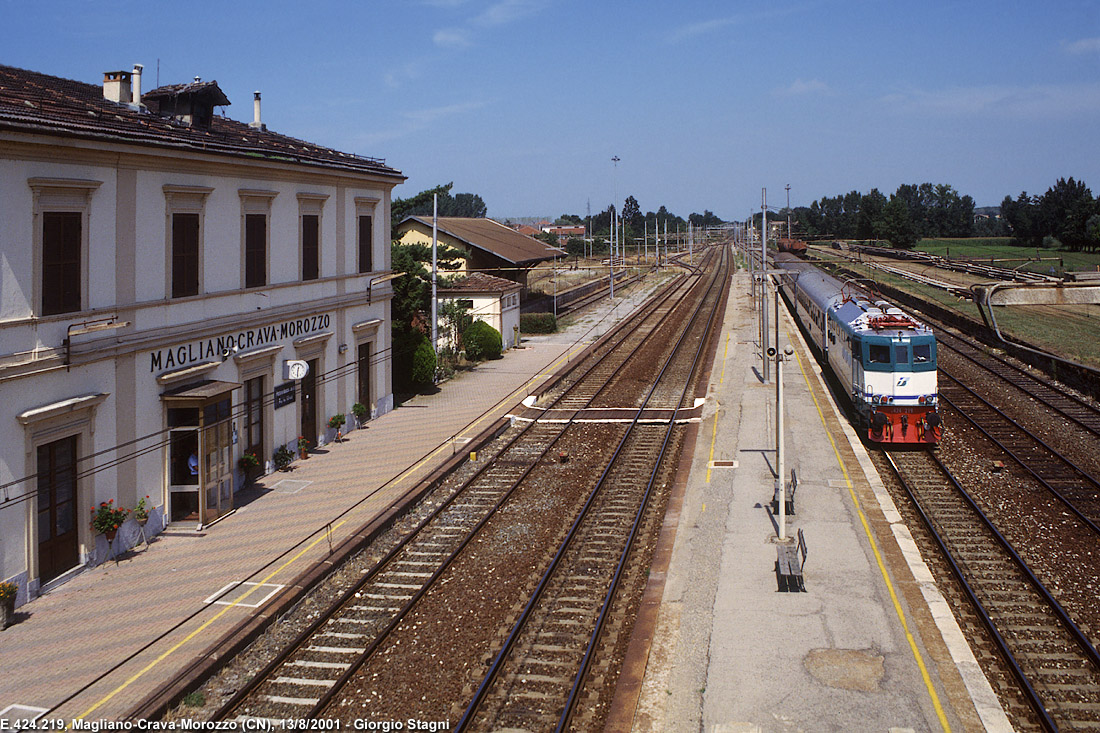
The Magliano-Crava-Morozzo railway station in Magliano Ali

Magliano Alpi (Piedmontese: Majan) is a comune (municipality) in the Province of Cuneo in the Italian region Piedmont, located about 70 kilometres (43 mi) south of Turin and about 20 kilometres (12 mi) northeast of Cuneo. As of 31 December 2004, it had a population of 2,145 and an area of 32.6 square kilometres (12.6 mi^{2}).

Magliano Alpi borders the following municipalities: Bene Vagienna, Carrù, Frabosa Soprana, Frabosa Sottana, Mondovì, Ormea, Rocca de' Baldi, Roccaforte Mondovì, Sant'Albano Stura, and Trinità.

== Demographic evolution ==
Historical population

Year	Pop.	±%
1861	2,469	—
1871	2,504	+1.4%
1881	2,629	+5.0%
1901	2,795	+6.3%
1911	2,686	−3.9%

Year	Pop.	±%
1921	2,710	+0.9%
1931	2,352	−13.2%
1936	2,249	−4.4%
1951	2,207	−1.9%
1961	2,114	−4.2%

Year	Pop.	±%
1971	1,968	−6.9%
1981	1,954	−0.7%
1991	1,974	+1.0%
2001	2,111	+6.9%

Source: Data from ISTAT

== Twin towns ==
Magliano Alpi is twinned with:

- Etruria, Córdoba, Argentina (2008)

== See also ==
- Lake della Brignola
- Lake Raschera
