= Lake della Brignola =

Alpine lake in the Ligurian Alps, Italy

Brignola Lake
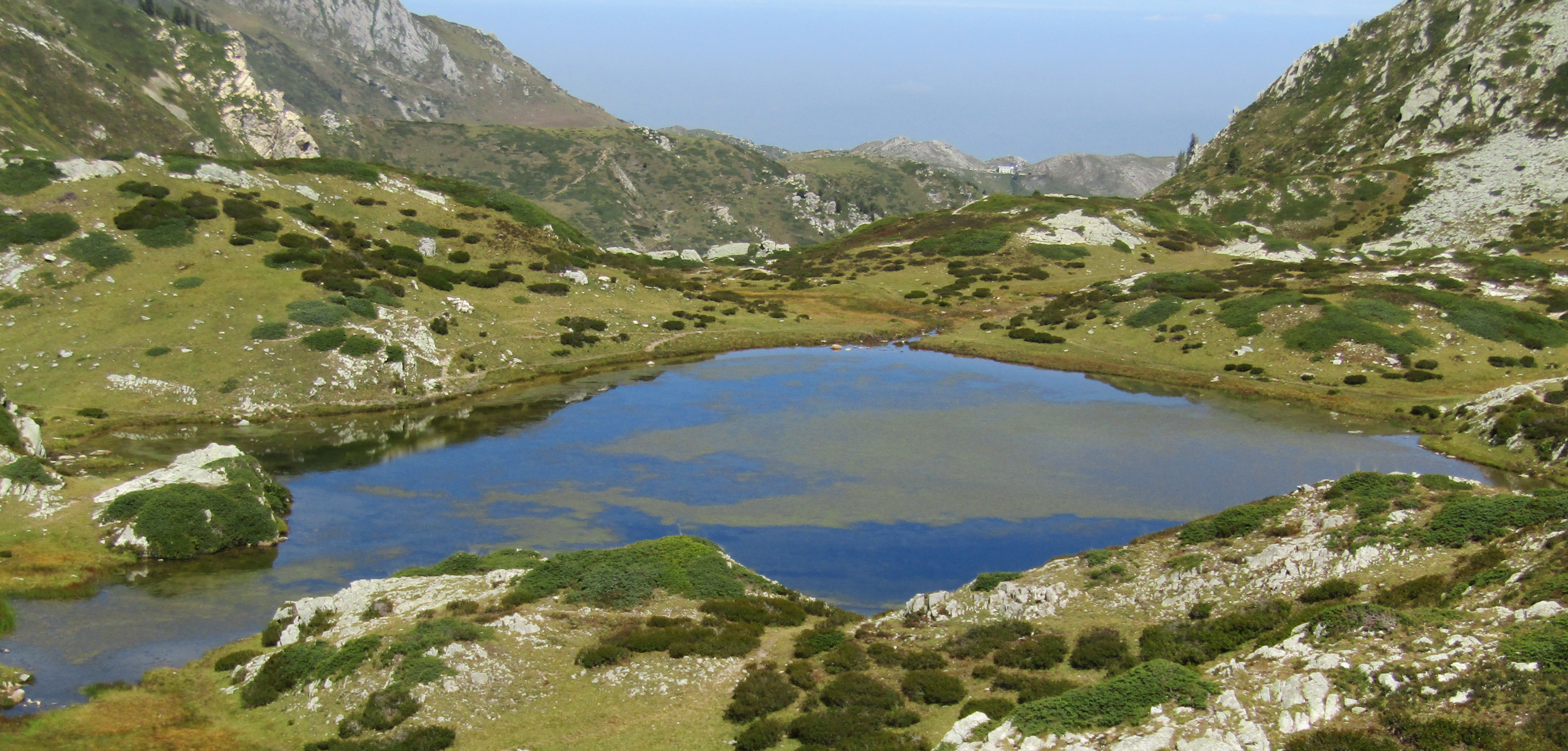

- Detailed map
- Location: Italy
- Coordinates: 44.19332°N 7.77705°E
- Basin countries: Italy
- Surface elevation: 2,131 m (6,991 ft)
- Islands: None
- Settlements: Magliano Alpi

The Brignola Lake is an alpine lake located at 2,131 m a.s.l. in the Ligurian Alps, in an island of the municipality of Magliano Alpi. It is situated in the upper valley of the Corsaglia. It is often referred to in the plural as Brignola Lakes due to the fact that a second lake once existed nearby, now filled with sediments.

== Toponym ==
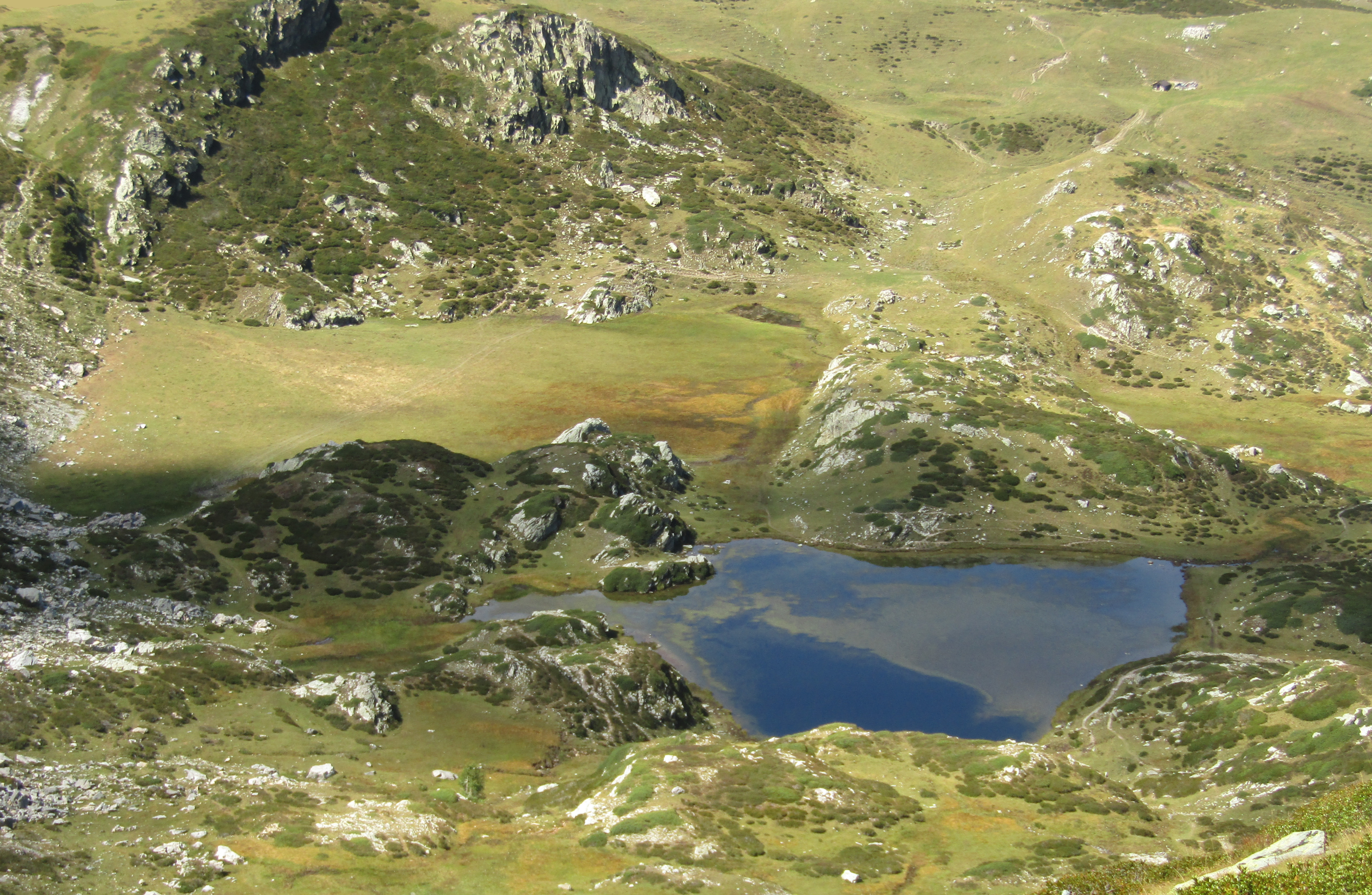
View from Bocchino della Brignola

The toponym Brignola may derive from the Provençal term brignoulà, an adjective meaning undulating or smoothed, referring to the smoothed rock outcrops that dominate the lake.

== Description ==
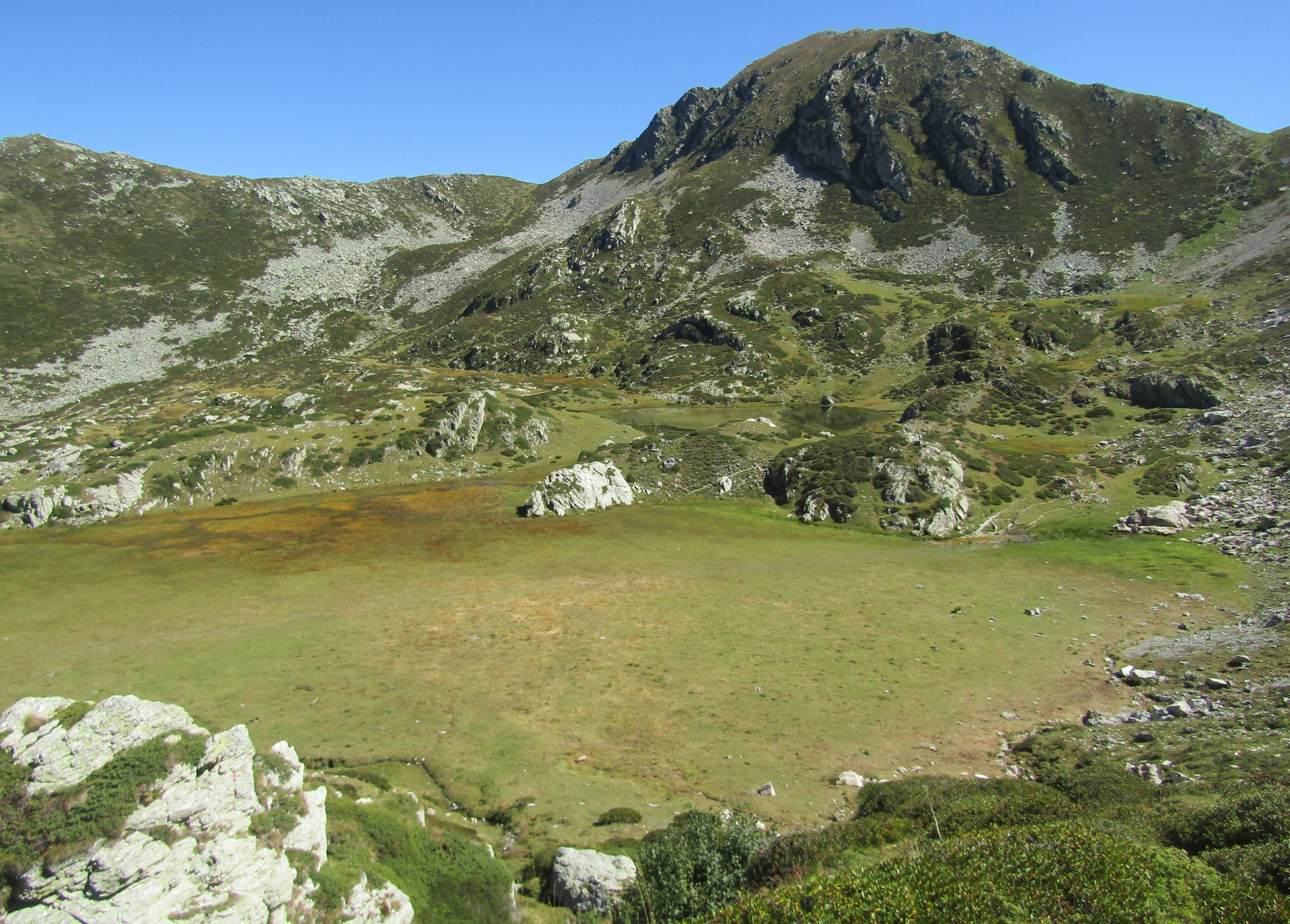
The peat bog occupying the basin of the second lake, with Cima Ferlette in the background

The lake is located in a basin surrounded by various mountains, including Cima Ferlette, Cima della Brignola, and Cima Seirasso. The Brignola river originates from the lake, and its waters, through the rio Crosa and rio Sbornina, eventually feed the Corsaglia. Near the lake, there is a grassy plateau that was once occupied by another small lake, now completely filled in and transformed into a wet peat bog. In the area, there are also other small bodies of water, which are often completely dry by the end of summer.

== Hiking ==
The lake can be reached on foot from the Balma Refuge. A trail passes through the Bocchino della Brignola, connecting it to the Raschera Lake, which can be reached via a long agro-pastoral dirt road starting from the bottom of the Val Corsaglia. From the lake, it is possible to reach Cima Ferlette without significant difficulty.

== Bibliography ==
- Montagna, Euro; Montaldo, Lorenzo (1981). "331 Bocchino della Brignola". Alpi Liguri [Ligurian Alps]. Guida dei Monti d'Italia (in Italian). Club Alpino Italiano-Touring Club Italiano.

=== Cartography ===
- Cartografia ufficiale italiana in scala 1:25.000 [Official Italian cartography at 1:25,000 scale] (in Italian). Istituto Geografico Militare.
- Carta dei sentieri e stradale scala 1:25.000 n. 16 Val Vermenagna, Valle Pesio, Alta Valle Ellero [Trail and road map at 1:25,000 scale no. 16 Val Vermenagna, Valle Pesio, Upper Valle Ellero] (in Italian). Ciriè: Fraternali editore. 2014. ISBN 9788897465140.
- Carta in scala 1:50.000 n. 8 Alpi Marittime e Liguri [Map at 1:50,000 scale no. 8 Maritime and Ligurian Alps] (in Italian). Torino: Istituto Geografico Centrale. 2017. ISBN 9788896455630.
