= Lake Revelli =

Alpine lake in Piedmont, Italy

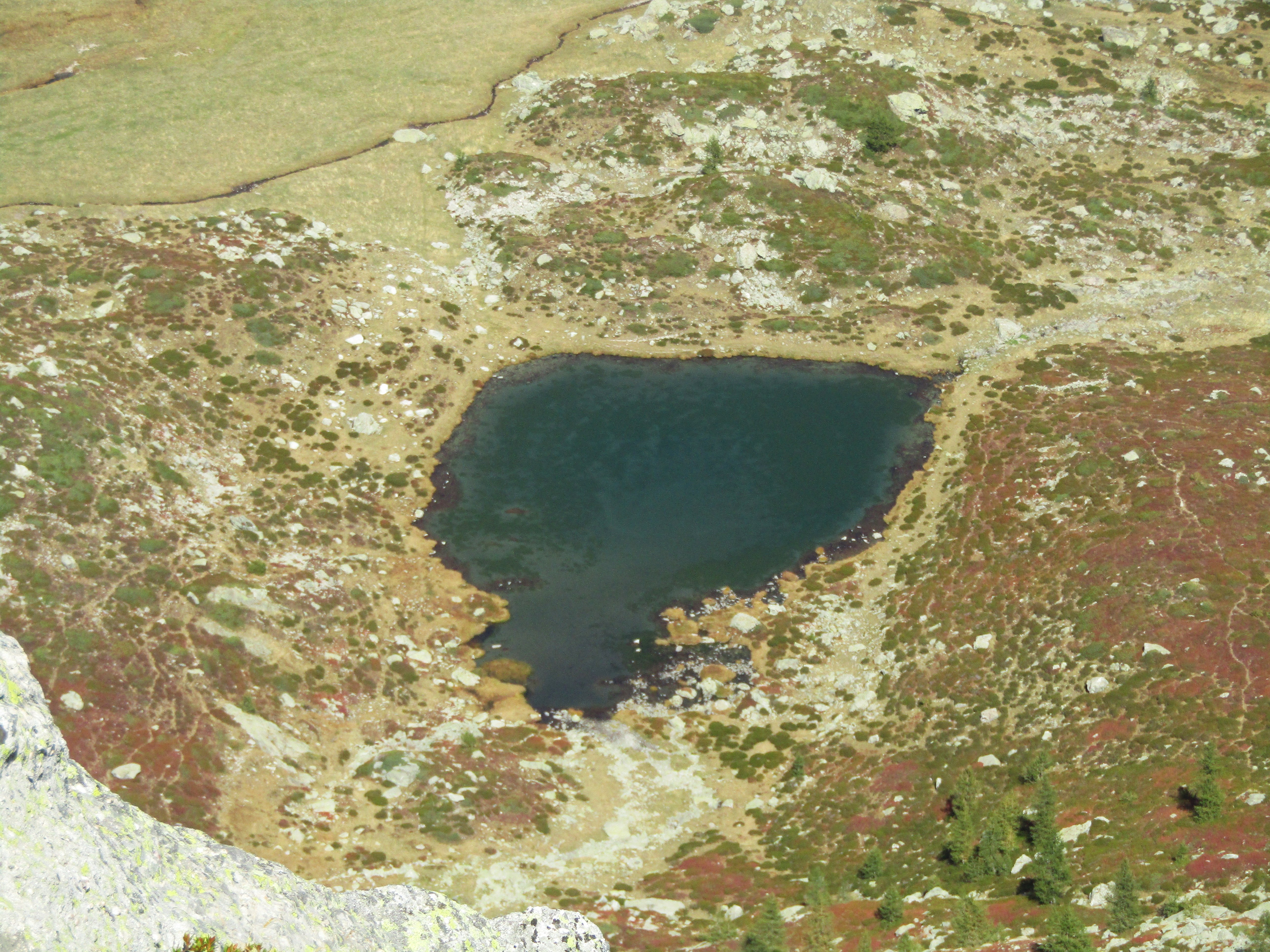
- View from Cima delle Roccate
- Interactive map of Lake Revelli
- Location: Ormea, Province of Cuneo, Piedmont, Italy
- Coordinates: 44.17363°N 7.8158°E
- Primary inflows: Several small streams
- Primary outflows: Rio Revelli
- Basin countries: Italy
- Surface elevation: 2,029 m (6,657 ft)
- Islands: None

Lake Revelli is a small alpine lake located at 2,029 m a.s.l. in the Ligurian Alps, in the municipality of Ormea. It is situated in the upper valley of the Corsaglia, just north of the Cima delle Roccate.

== Description ==
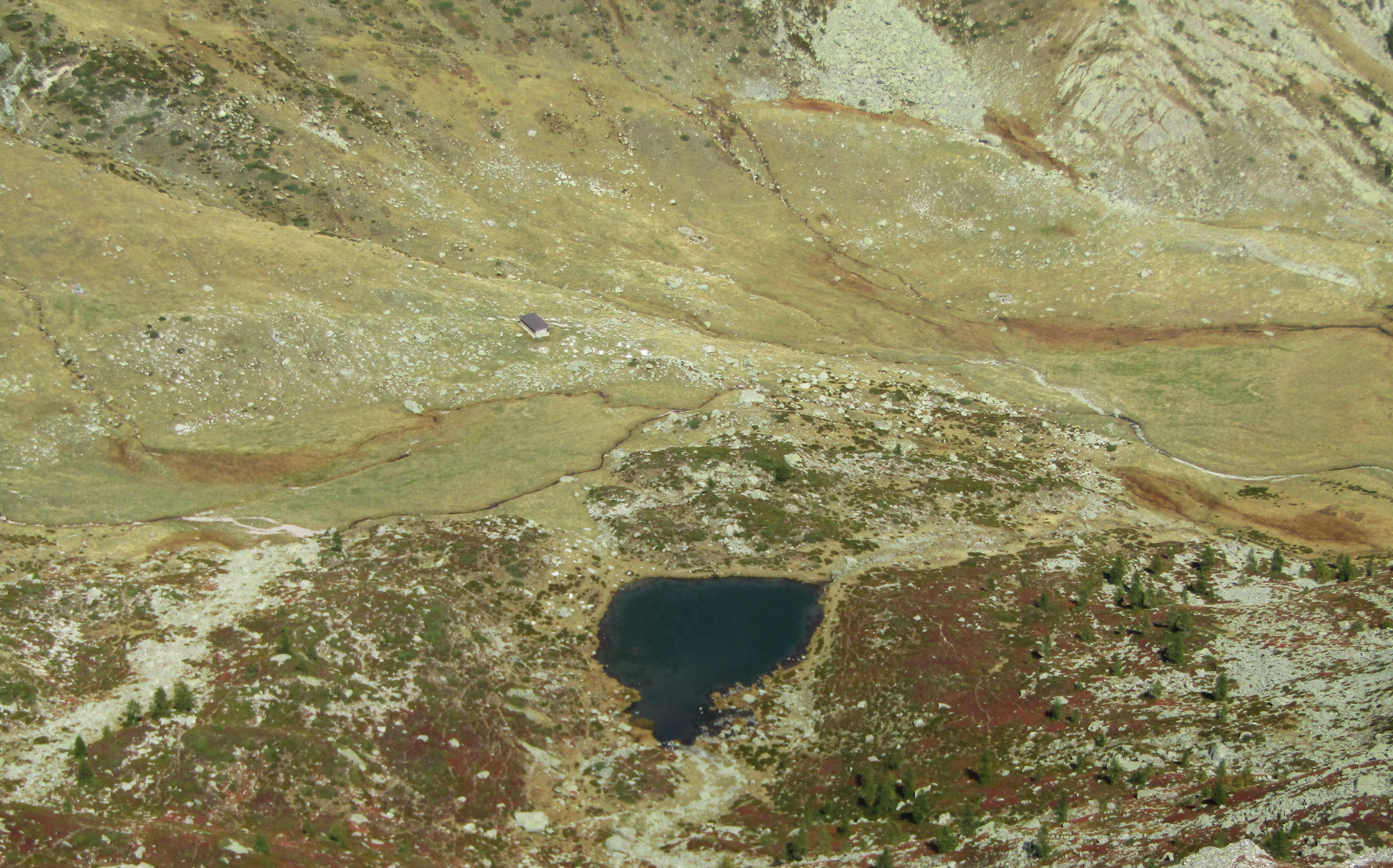
The lake’s basin with the Cavarero bivouac

The water body is located in Val Corsaglia at 2,029 m elevation, at the head of the valley. It lies within a basin surrounded by various peaks ranging in height between 2,300 and 2,500 meters. Not far from the lake are a marshy area and the Rocca della Sella (2,040 m), northeast of the water body. Its outflow is the Rio Revelli, the main source stream of the Corsaglia. To the south of the lake basin runs the mountain ridge that separates Val Corsaglia from the Alta Val Tanaro, particularly the section of the watershed that includes the Monte Rotondo, the Bric di Conoia, the Cima delle Roccate, and the distinctive Pizzo d’Ormea.

The small basin hosts marshy vegetation dominated by Carex fusca.

Near the lake is the Bivacco Franco Cavarero, dedicated to an alpinist from Mondovì who died in 1963 near the Mondolè

== Geology ==
The basin hosting the lake was carved by the ancient glacier that traversed Val Corsaglia. The depression is formed by besimaudites, rocks with a porphyritic structure typical of the mountains of southwestern Piedmont.

== Hiking ==
The lake can be reached by trail from Ponte Murao near Bossea, in Val Corsaglia, following the valley floor, or from the Val Tanaro, passing through the Colla del Pizzo or the Bocchino dell’Aseo.

== Bibliography ==
- Montagna, Euro; Montaldo, Lorenzo (1981). Alpi Liguri [Ligurian Alps]. Guida dei Monti d'Italia (in Italian). CAI-TCI.

=== Cartography ===
- Cartografia ufficiale italiana [Official Italian Cartography] (in Italian). Istituto Geografico Militare.
- "Mondovì Val Ellero Val Maudagna Val Corsaglia Val Casotto". Carta dei sentieri e stradale [Map of Trails and Roads] (in Italian). Ciriè: Fraternali editore.
- "Alpi Marittime e Liguri" [Maritime and Ligurian Alps]. Carta [Map] (in Italian). Turin: Istituto Geografico Centrale.
