= Ellero =

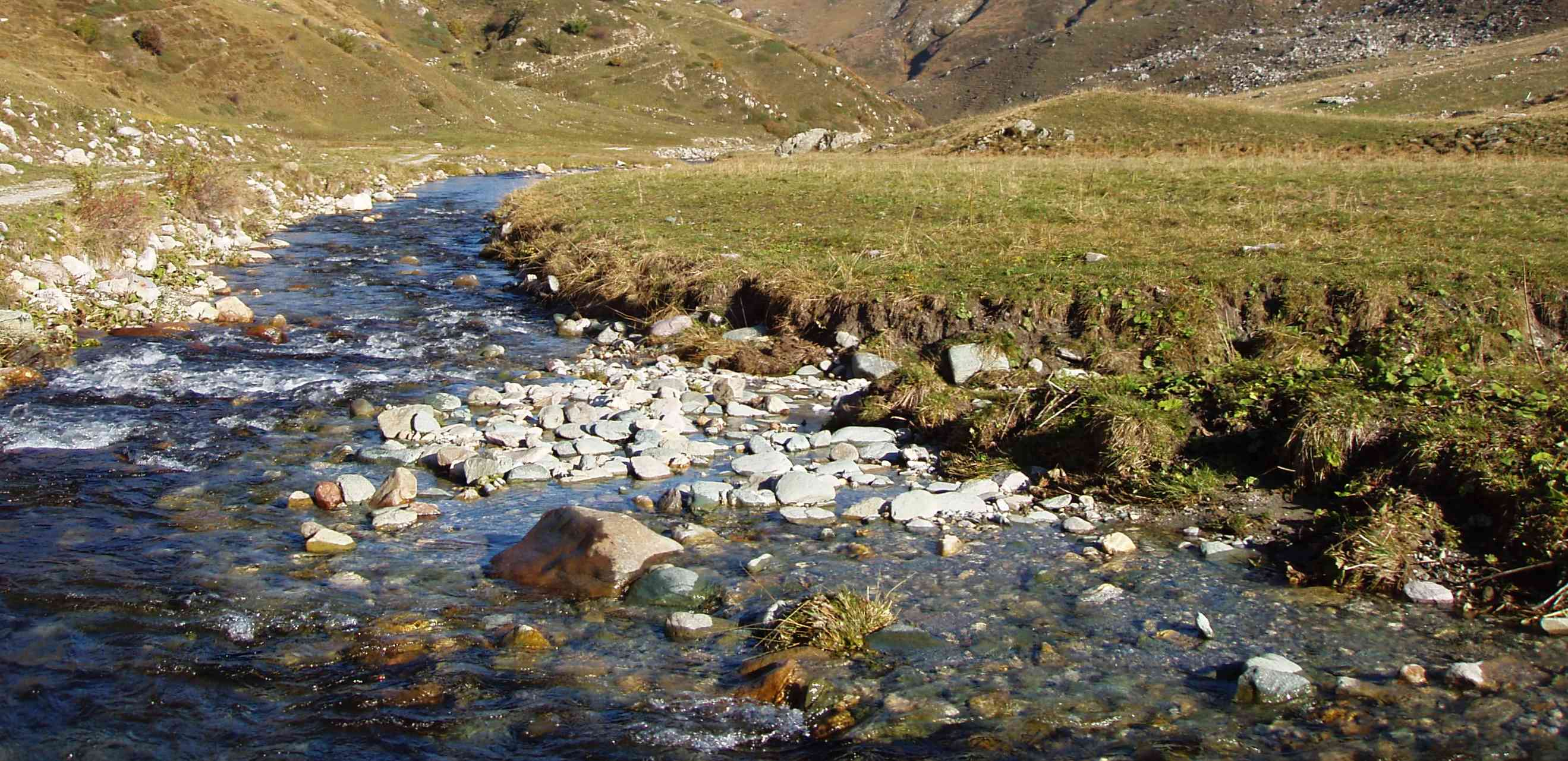
- The Ellero near its source

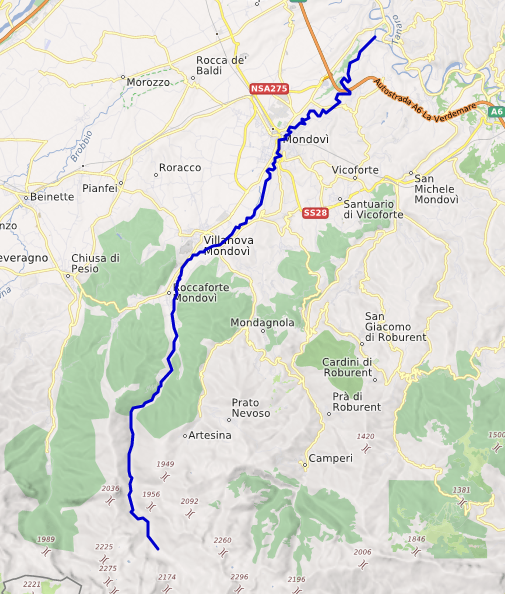

Location
- Country: Italy
- Region: Piedmont
- Province: Province of Cuneo

Physical characteristics
- Source: Pian Marchisio
  - location: Ligurian Alps
- Mouth: Tanaro
  - coordinates: 44.4431°N 7.8856°E
- Length: 34.6-kilometre (21.5 mi)
- Basin size: 197.45 km^{2} (76.24 mi^{2})
- Discharge
  - location: near Bastia Mondovì
  - average: 5.2

Basin features
- Progression: Tanaro→ Po→ Adriatic Sea
- Tributaries
  - right: Maudagna

The Ellero is a 34.6-kilometre (21.5 mi) long river in northwestern Italy (Piedmont).

== Geography ==
The river is a tributary to the river Tanaro, which is a tributary of the river Po. Its source is in Pian Marchisio, a large plateau of the Ligurian Alps. It flows northwards digging the Valle Ellero, which ends in the Po plain near Roccaforte Mondovì. The Ellero then follows its course through the plain turning NE, crosses Villanova Mondovì (where it gets from right hand the Maudagna, its main tributary) and then after Mondovì, with some meanders, reaches Bastia Mondovì where it joins the river Tanaro.

=== Main tributaries ===
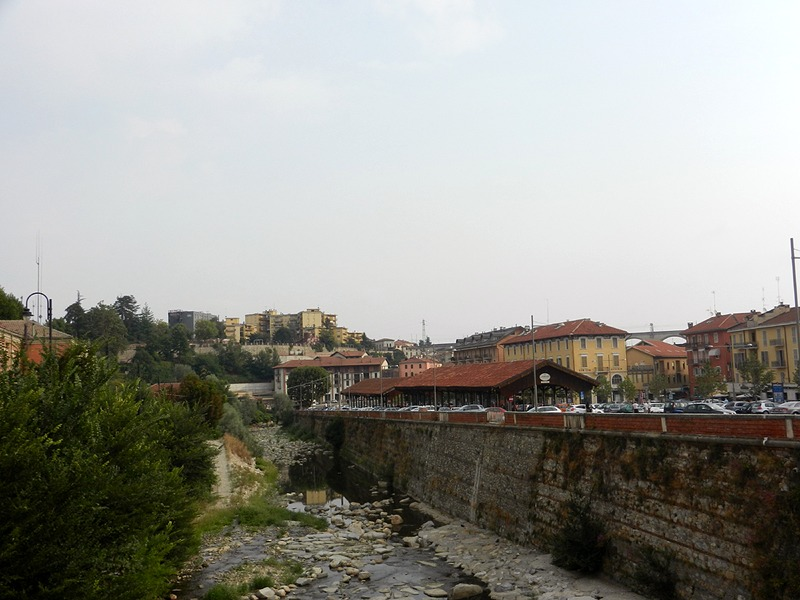
The Ellero in Mondovì

- Left hand side:
  - torrente Lurisia, that crosses the village of Lurisia.
- Right hand side:
  - torrente Maudagna,
  - torrente Ermena, which reaches the Ellero in Mondovì.
  - torrente Niere, joining the Ellero near Monastero di Vasco

== See also ==
- List of rivers of Italy
- Lake Rataira

== See also ==
Media related to Ellero at Wikimedia Commons

- List of rivers of Italy
