= Lake Rataira =

Alpine lake in Piedmont, Italy

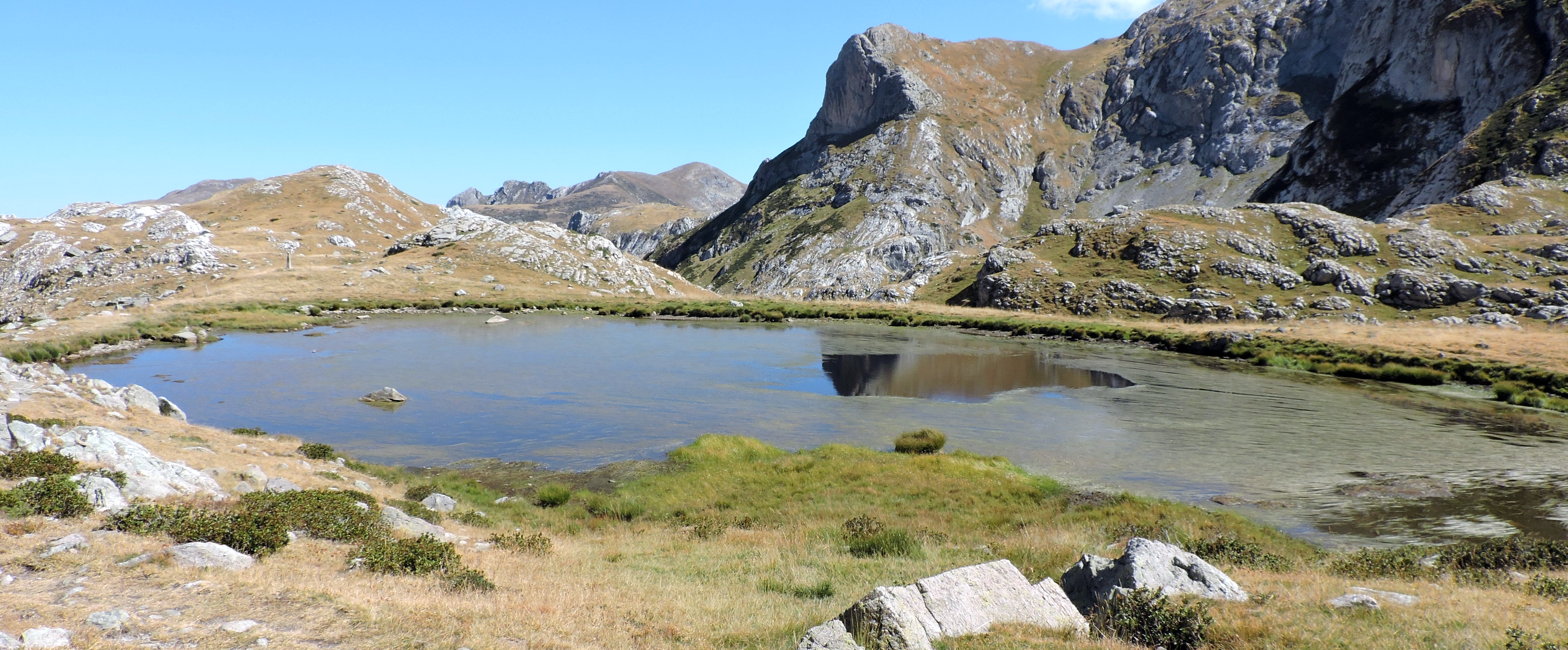
- Interactive map of Lake Rataira
- Location: Roccaforte Mondovì, Province of Cuneo, Piedmont, Italy
- Coordinates: 44.17709°N 7.70857°E
- Basin countries: Italy
- Surface elevation: 2,204 m (7,231 ft)
- Islands: None

The Lake Rataira is an alpine lake located at 2,204 m a.s.l. in the Ligurian Alps, in the municipality of Roccaforte Mondovì. It is situated in the upper valley of the Ellero, just north of the Colle del Pas.

== Toponym ==
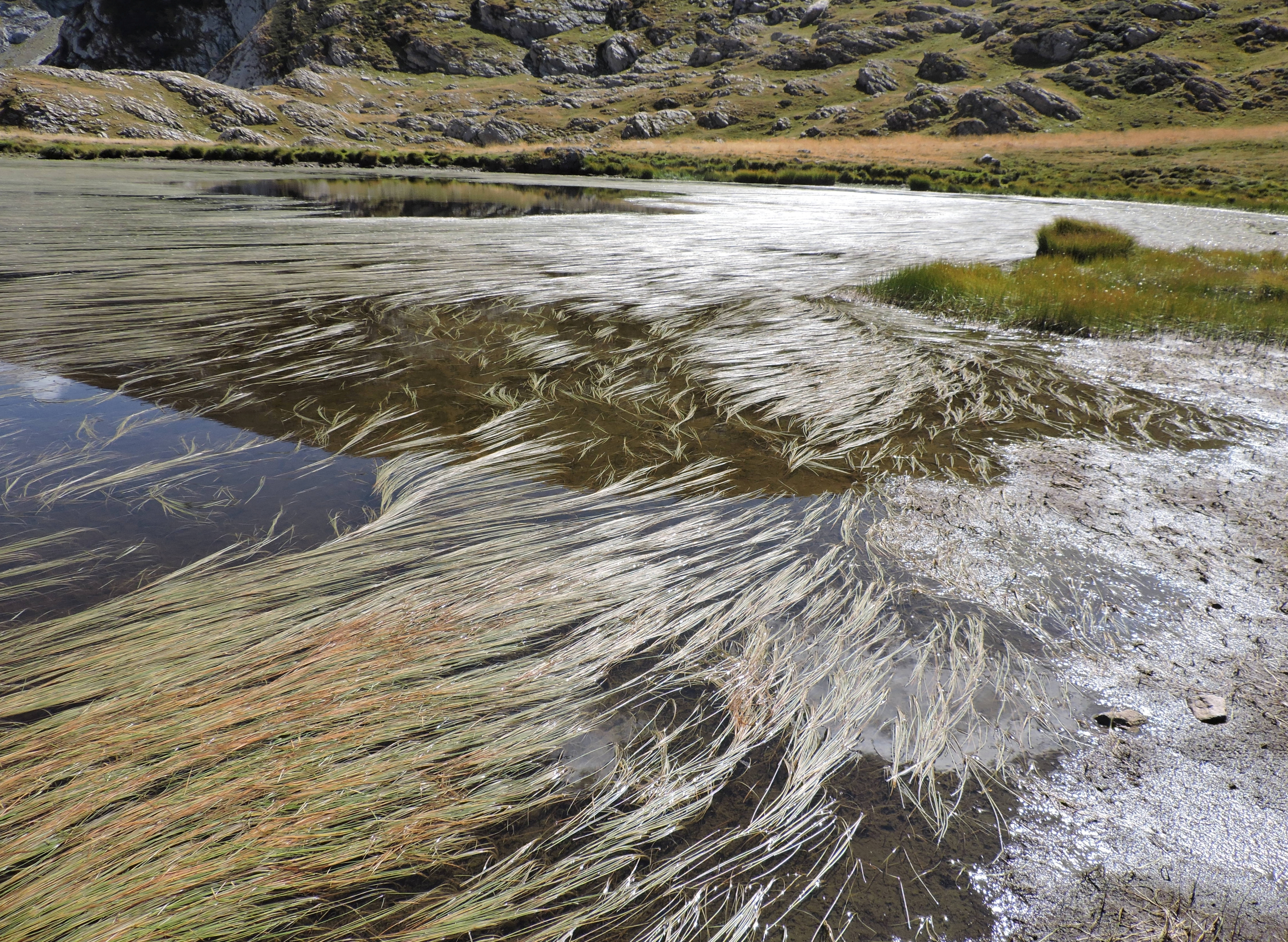
Aquatic vegetation in the lake at the end of summer

The lake, besides being known as Rataira, is also referred to as Lake Ratavuloira, a toponym derived from the term used in Piedmontese for the bat (flying rat). Rataira could also come from Piedmontese and mean mousetrap, perhaps in the sense that the lake’s muddy waters can act as a trap for rodents.

== History ==
Not far from the water’s surface, there is a menhir. Its origin is uncertain, possibly Celtic.

== Hiking ==
The lake can be reached via the trail that from Pian Marchisio, in the municipality of Roccaforte Mondovì, ascends to the Colle del Pas, a pass that is in turn connected to Carnino (municipality of Briga Alta, Val Tanaro). Another route starts from the Rifugio Garelli refuge and, after passing the Porta Sestrera (through which the GTA also passes), quickly reaches the lake. From the lake, it is also possible to head into the valley west of the Rifugio Garelli by crossing the Porta del Merguareis, a pass at 2,298 m a.s.l.

== Bibliography ==
- Cartografia ufficiale italiana [Official Italian Cartography] (in Italian). Istituto Geografico Militare.
- "Val Vermenagna, Valle Pesio, Alta Valle Ellero". Carta dei sentieri e stradale [Map of Trails and Roads] (in Italian). Ciriè: Fraternali editore.
- "Alpi Marittime e Liguri" [Maritime and Ligurian Alps]. Carta [Map] (in Italian). Turin: Istituto Geografico Centrale.
