= Armella =

Armella is a surname. Notable people with the surname include:

- Eduardo Armella (1928–2011), Argentine sports shooter
- Jorge Carral Armella (born 1983), Mexican former swimmer
- Pedro Armella (born 1930), Argentine former sports shooter
- Pedro Aspe Armella (born 1950), Mexican economist

== See also ==
- Armella Nicolas or La bonne Armelle, was a Breton serving-maid important in French popular Catholic piety
