= Roccaforte Mondovì =

- Comune
- Comune di Roccaforte Mondovì
- Coat of arms

- Location within Italy Location within Piedmont
- Coordinates: 44°19′N 7°45′E
- Country: Italy
- Region: Piedmont
- Province: Cuneo (CN)
- Frazioni: Baracco, Dho, Rastello, Lurisia, Prea, Annunziata, Bertini, Norea

Government
  - Mayor: Paolo Bongiovanni (Insieme si può)

Area
  - Total: 84.7 km^{2} (32.7 sq mi)
- Elevation: 574 m (1,883 ft)

Population (31 July 2010)
  - Total: 2,134
  - Density: 25.2/km^{2} (65.3/sq mi)
- Demonym: Roccafortesi
- Time zone: UTC+1 (CET)
  - Summer (DST): UTC+2 (CEST)
- Postal code: 12088
- Dialing code: 0174

Roccaforte Mondovì (Vivaro-Alpine: Ròcafuòrt, Ròcafòrt, or Rocafòrt) is a comune (municipality) in the Province of Cuneo in the Italian region Piedmont, located about 80 kilometres (50 mi) south of Turin and about 20 kilometres (12 mi) southeast of Cuneo.

Roccaforte Mondovì borders the following municipalities: Briga Alta, Chiusa di Pesio, Frabosa Sottana, Magliano Alpi, Ormea, Pianfei, and Villanova Mondovì.

== See also ==
- Lake Rataira
