= Armella Nicolas =

Armella Nicolas or La bonne Armelle (19 December 1606 – 24 October 1671) was a Breton serving-maid important in French popular Catholic piety.
