= Ormea =

Ormea Ulmeta
- Comune
- Città di Ormea
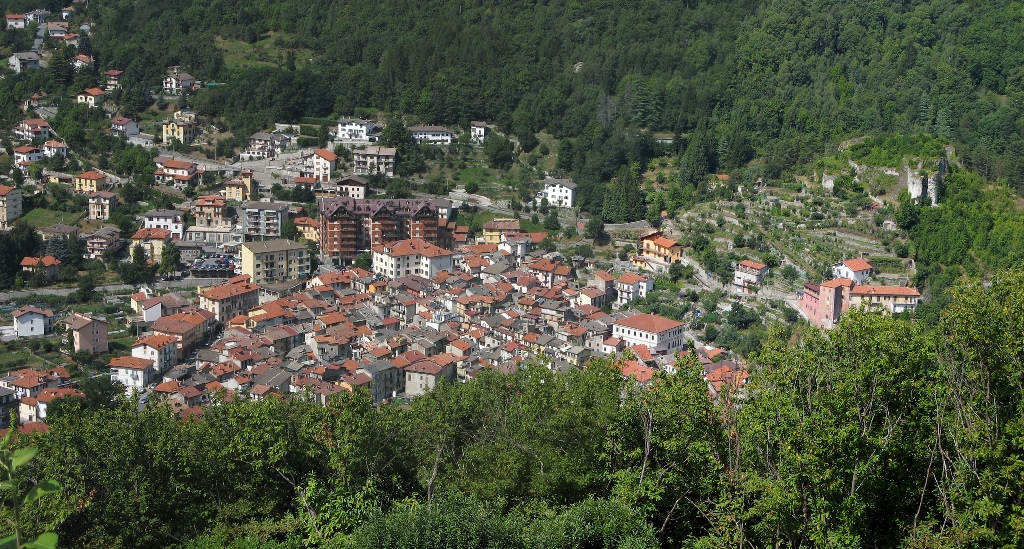
- Ormea

- Location within Italy Location within Piedmont
- Coordinates: 44°9′N 7°55′E
- Country: Italy
- Region: Piedmont
- Province: Cuneo (CN)
- Frazioni: Viozene, Chionea, Ponte di Nava, Bossieta, Prale, Barchi, Eca, Albra, Villaro, Valdarmella, Chioraira, Quarzina

Government
  - Mayor: Giorgio Ferraris (Civic List)

Area
  - Total: 124.5 km^{2} (48.1 sq mi)
- Elevation: 736 m (2,415 ft)

Population (31 December 2017)
  - Total: 1,607
  - Density: 12.91/km^{2} (33.43/sq mi)
- Demonym: Ormeaschi or Ormeesi
- Time zone: UTC+1 (CET)
  - Summer (DST): UTC+2 (CEST)
- Postal code: 12078
- Dialing code: 0174
- Website: Official website

Ormea is a comune (municipality) in the Province of Cuneo in the Italian region Piedmont, located about 100 kilometres (62 mi) south of Turin and about 40 kilometres (25 mi) southeast of Cuneo.

Ormea borders the following municipalities: Alto, Armo, Briga Alta, Caprauna, Cosio di Arroscia, Frabosa Soprana, Garessio, Magliano Alpi, Nasino, Pornassio, Roburent, and Roccaforte Mondovì.

== See also ==
- Monte Armetta
- Monte della Guardia
- Bric di Conoia
- Lake Revelli
- Pizzo d'Ormea
