= Raschera =

Italian cheese

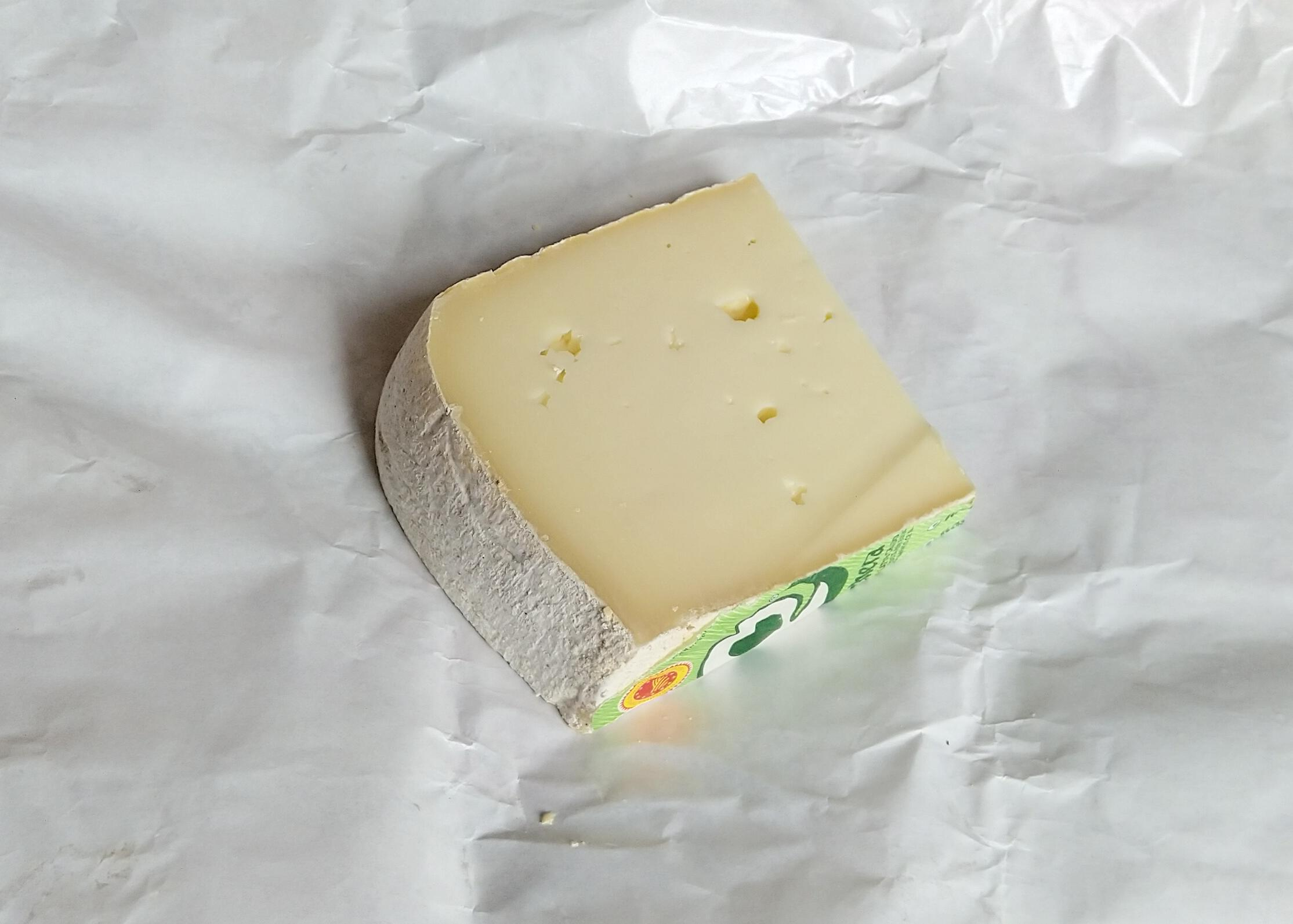
- Country of origin: Italy
- Region, town: Piedmont
- Region: Cuneo
- Source of milk: Cow
- Pasteurized: Raw or Pasteurized
- Texture: semi-hard elastic
- Fat content: 43% to 53%
- Protein content: 43% to 53%
- Dimensions: 30–40 cm (12–16 in) cylinder or 40 cm (16 in) square
- Weight: 7 to 9 kg (15 to 20 lb)
- Aging time: 30 days or more
- Certification: DOP

Raschera is an Italian pressed fat or medium fat, semi-hard cheese made with raw or pasteurized cow milk, to which a small amount of sheep's and/or goat's milk may be added. It has an ivory white color inside with irregularly spaced small eyes, and a semi-hard rind which is red gray sometimes with yellow highlights. It has a savory and salty taste, similar to Muenster cheese, and can be moderately sharp if the cheese has been aged.

The cheese was given an Italian protected designation of origin (DOP) in July 1996, and may also carry the name "di alpeggio" (from mountain pasture) if the cheese was made in the mountainous areas of its designated province of Cuneo.

== See also ==
- List of Italian cheeses
